

256001–256100 

|-bgcolor=#E9E9E9
| 256001 ||  || — || October 11, 2006 || Palomar || NEAT || HNS || align=right | 1.3 km || 
|-id=002 bgcolor=#E9E9E9
| 256002 ||  || — || October 2, 2006 || Mount Lemmon || Mount Lemmon Survey || — || align=right | 1.8 km || 
|-id=003 bgcolor=#E9E9E9
| 256003 ||  || — || October 3, 2006 || Mount Lemmon || Mount Lemmon Survey || — || align=right | 1.3 km || 
|-id=004 bgcolor=#FFC2E0
| 256004 || 2006 UP || — || October 16, 2006 || Catalina || CSS || AMOcritical || align=right data-sort-value="0.089" | 89 m || 
|-id=005 bgcolor=#E9E9E9
| 256005 ||  || — || October 16, 2006 || Catalina || CSS || — || align=right | 1.1 km || 
|-id=006 bgcolor=#E9E9E9
| 256006 ||  || — || October 16, 2006 || Catalina || CSS || — || align=right | 2.1 km || 
|-id=007 bgcolor=#E9E9E9
| 256007 ||  || — || October 16, 2006 || Catalina || CSS || EUN || align=right | 1.6 km || 
|-id=008 bgcolor=#E9E9E9
| 256008 ||  || — || October 16, 2006 || Catalina || CSS || — || align=right | 2.2 km || 
|-id=009 bgcolor=#E9E9E9
| 256009 ||  || — || October 16, 2006 || Catalina || CSS || — || align=right | 2.3 km || 
|-id=010 bgcolor=#E9E9E9
| 256010 ||  || — || October 16, 2006 || Kitt Peak || Spacewatch || KON || align=right | 2.5 km || 
|-id=011 bgcolor=#E9E9E9
| 256011 ||  || — || October 17, 2006 || Catalina || CSS || — || align=right | 1.8 km || 
|-id=012 bgcolor=#E9E9E9
| 256012 ||  || — || October 17, 2006 || Mount Lemmon || Mount Lemmon Survey || — || align=right | 3.8 km || 
|-id=013 bgcolor=#E9E9E9
| 256013 ||  || — || October 17, 2006 || Mount Lemmon || Mount Lemmon Survey || — || align=right | 2.5 km || 
|-id=014 bgcolor=#E9E9E9
| 256014 ||  || — || October 17, 2006 || Mount Lemmon || Mount Lemmon Survey || — || align=right | 1.2 km || 
|-id=015 bgcolor=#E9E9E9
| 256015 ||  || — || October 16, 2006 || Kitt Peak || Spacewatch || — || align=right data-sort-value="0.87" | 870 m || 
|-id=016 bgcolor=#fefefe
| 256016 ||  || — || October 16, 2006 || Kitt Peak || Spacewatch || — || align=right | 1.3 km || 
|-id=017 bgcolor=#E9E9E9
| 256017 ||  || — || October 16, 2006 || Kitt Peak || Spacewatch || WIT || align=right | 1.2 km || 
|-id=018 bgcolor=#E9E9E9
| 256018 ||  || — || October 16, 2006 || Kitt Peak || Spacewatch || — || align=right | 1.0 km || 
|-id=019 bgcolor=#E9E9E9
| 256019 ||  || — || October 16, 2006 || Kitt Peak || Spacewatch || — || align=right | 1.9 km || 
|-id=020 bgcolor=#E9E9E9
| 256020 ||  || — || October 16, 2006 || Kitt Peak || Spacewatch || — || align=right | 1.7 km || 
|-id=021 bgcolor=#E9E9E9
| 256021 ||  || — || October 16, 2006 || Kitt Peak || Spacewatch || — || align=right | 1.3 km || 
|-id=022 bgcolor=#E9E9E9
| 256022 ||  || — || October 16, 2006 || Kitt Peak || Spacewatch || — || align=right | 1.7 km || 
|-id=023 bgcolor=#E9E9E9
| 256023 ||  || — || October 16, 2006 || Kitt Peak || Spacewatch || — || align=right data-sort-value="0.96" | 960 m || 
|-id=024 bgcolor=#E9E9E9
| 256024 ||  || — || October 16, 2006 || Kitt Peak || Spacewatch || WIT || align=right | 1.1 km || 
|-id=025 bgcolor=#E9E9E9
| 256025 ||  || — || October 16, 2006 || Catalina || CSS || — || align=right | 2.6 km || 
|-id=026 bgcolor=#E9E9E9
| 256026 ||  || — || October 16, 2006 || Kitt Peak || Spacewatch || — || align=right | 2.4 km || 
|-id=027 bgcolor=#E9E9E9
| 256027 ||  || — || October 16, 2006 || Kitt Peak || Spacewatch || — || align=right | 2.0 km || 
|-id=028 bgcolor=#E9E9E9
| 256028 ||  || — || October 16, 2006 || Kitt Peak || Spacewatch || HEN || align=right | 1.1 km || 
|-id=029 bgcolor=#E9E9E9
| 256029 ||  || — || October 16, 2006 || Kitt Peak || Spacewatch || — || align=right | 1.5 km || 
|-id=030 bgcolor=#E9E9E9
| 256030 ||  || — || October 16, 2006 || Kitt Peak || Spacewatch || — || align=right | 2.7 km || 
|-id=031 bgcolor=#E9E9E9
| 256031 ||  || — || October 16, 2006 || Kitt Peak || Spacewatch || — || align=right | 1.5 km || 
|-id=032 bgcolor=#E9E9E9
| 256032 ||  || — || October 16, 2006 || Kitt Peak || Spacewatch || — || align=right | 2.7 km || 
|-id=033 bgcolor=#fefefe
| 256033 ||  || — || October 16, 2006 || Bergisch Gladbach || W. Bickel || Vfast? || align=right data-sort-value="0.83" | 830 m || 
|-id=034 bgcolor=#E9E9E9
| 256034 ||  || — || October 17, 2006 || Mount Lemmon || Mount Lemmon Survey || — || align=right | 3.0 km || 
|-id=035 bgcolor=#E9E9E9
| 256035 ||  || — || October 19, 2006 || Goodricke-Pigott || R. A. Tucker || — || align=right | 2.7 km || 
|-id=036 bgcolor=#fefefe
| 256036 ||  || — || October 16, 2006 || Catalina || CSS || NYS || align=right | 1.0 km || 
|-id=037 bgcolor=#E9E9E9
| 256037 ||  || — || October 16, 2006 || Catalina || CSS || — || align=right | 1.2 km || 
|-id=038 bgcolor=#E9E9E9
| 256038 ||  || — || October 16, 2006 || Catalina || CSS || — || align=right | 1.6 km || 
|-id=039 bgcolor=#E9E9E9
| 256039 ||  || — || October 17, 2006 || Kitt Peak || Spacewatch || — || align=right | 1.4 km || 
|-id=040 bgcolor=#E9E9E9
| 256040 ||  || — || October 17, 2006 || Kitt Peak || Spacewatch || — || align=right | 2.5 km || 
|-id=041 bgcolor=#E9E9E9
| 256041 ||  || — || October 17, 2006 || Mount Lemmon || Mount Lemmon Survey || — || align=right | 1.3 km || 
|-id=042 bgcolor=#E9E9E9
| 256042 ||  || — || October 17, 2006 || Kitt Peak || Spacewatch || — || align=right | 2.2 km || 
|-id=043 bgcolor=#E9E9E9
| 256043 ||  || — || October 17, 2006 || Kitt Peak || Spacewatch || — || align=right | 2.6 km || 
|-id=044 bgcolor=#E9E9E9
| 256044 ||  || — || October 17, 2006 || Mount Lemmon || Mount Lemmon Survey || — || align=right | 2.6 km || 
|-id=045 bgcolor=#E9E9E9
| 256045 ||  || — || October 17, 2006 || Kitt Peak || Spacewatch || — || align=right | 1.1 km || 
|-id=046 bgcolor=#E9E9E9
| 256046 ||  || — || October 17, 2006 || Kitt Peak || Spacewatch || NEM || align=right | 2.9 km || 
|-id=047 bgcolor=#E9E9E9
| 256047 ||  || — || October 17, 2006 || Kitt Peak || Spacewatch || — || align=right | 1.7 km || 
|-id=048 bgcolor=#E9E9E9
| 256048 ||  || — || October 18, 2006 || Kitt Peak || Spacewatch || — || align=right | 1.5 km || 
|-id=049 bgcolor=#E9E9E9
| 256049 ||  || — || October 18, 2006 || Kitt Peak || Spacewatch || — || align=right | 1.9 km || 
|-id=050 bgcolor=#E9E9E9
| 256050 ||  || — || October 18, 2006 || Kitt Peak || Spacewatch || — || align=right | 2.5 km || 
|-id=051 bgcolor=#E9E9E9
| 256051 ||  || — || October 18, 2006 || Kitt Peak || Spacewatch || — || align=right | 1.2 km || 
|-id=052 bgcolor=#fefefe
| 256052 ||  || — || October 19, 2006 || Kitt Peak || Spacewatch || — || align=right | 1.1 km || 
|-id=053 bgcolor=#E9E9E9
| 256053 ||  || — || October 19, 2006 || Kitt Peak || Spacewatch || — || align=right | 2.0 km || 
|-id=054 bgcolor=#E9E9E9
| 256054 ||  || — || October 19, 2006 || Kitt Peak || Spacewatch || — || align=right | 2.1 km || 
|-id=055 bgcolor=#fefefe
| 256055 ||  || — || October 19, 2006 || Kitt Peak || Spacewatch || — || align=right data-sort-value="0.95" | 950 m || 
|-id=056 bgcolor=#E9E9E9
| 256056 ||  || — || October 19, 2006 || Kitt Peak || Spacewatch || — || align=right | 2.0 km || 
|-id=057 bgcolor=#E9E9E9
| 256057 ||  || — || October 19, 2006 || Kitt Peak || Spacewatch || — || align=right | 1.2 km || 
|-id=058 bgcolor=#E9E9E9
| 256058 ||  || — || October 19, 2006 || Catalina || CSS || — || align=right | 1.9 km || 
|-id=059 bgcolor=#E9E9E9
| 256059 ||  || — || October 19, 2006 || Kitt Peak || Spacewatch || — || align=right | 1.7 km || 
|-id=060 bgcolor=#E9E9E9
| 256060 ||  || — || October 19, 2006 || Palomar || NEAT || — || align=right | 2.3 km || 
|-id=061 bgcolor=#E9E9E9
| 256061 ||  || — || October 19, 2006 || Kitt Peak || Spacewatch || — || align=right | 2.0 km || 
|-id=062 bgcolor=#E9E9E9
| 256062 ||  || — || October 19, 2006 || Mount Lemmon || Mount Lemmon Survey || — || align=right | 2.0 km || 
|-id=063 bgcolor=#E9E9E9
| 256063 ||  || — || October 19, 2006 || Kitt Peak || Spacewatch || WIT || align=right data-sort-value="0.99" | 990 m || 
|-id=064 bgcolor=#E9E9E9
| 256064 ||  || — || October 19, 2006 || Kitt Peak || Spacewatch || — || align=right | 2.0 km || 
|-id=065 bgcolor=#E9E9E9
| 256065 ||  || — || October 19, 2006 || Catalina || CSS || BAR || align=right | 1.4 km || 
|-id=066 bgcolor=#fefefe
| 256066 ||  || — || October 20, 2006 || Mount Lemmon || Mount Lemmon Survey || V || align=right data-sort-value="0.89" | 890 m || 
|-id=067 bgcolor=#fefefe
| 256067 ||  || — || October 21, 2006 || Mount Lemmon || Mount Lemmon Survey || — || align=right | 1.2 km || 
|-id=068 bgcolor=#E9E9E9
| 256068 ||  || — || October 21, 2006 || Mount Lemmon || Mount Lemmon Survey || — || align=right | 2.3 km || 
|-id=069 bgcolor=#fefefe
| 256069 ||  || — || October 16, 2006 || Catalina || CSS || — || align=right | 1.0 km || 
|-id=070 bgcolor=#fefefe
| 256070 ||  || — || October 16, 2006 || Catalina || CSS || FLO || align=right data-sort-value="0.86" | 860 m || 
|-id=071 bgcolor=#E9E9E9
| 256071 ||  || — || October 16, 2006 || Catalina || CSS || — || align=right | 1.0 km || 
|-id=072 bgcolor=#E9E9E9
| 256072 ||  || — || October 16, 2006 || Catalina || CSS || — || align=right | 1.9 km || 
|-id=073 bgcolor=#fefefe
| 256073 ||  || — || October 16, 2006 || Catalina || CSS || — || align=right | 1.4 km || 
|-id=074 bgcolor=#E9E9E9
| 256074 ||  || — || October 16, 2006 || Catalina || CSS || EUN || align=right | 1.4 km || 
|-id=075 bgcolor=#E9E9E9
| 256075 ||  || — || October 17, 2006 || Catalina || CSS || WIT || align=right | 1.5 km || 
|-id=076 bgcolor=#E9E9E9
| 256076 ||  || — || October 19, 2006 || Catalina || CSS || MAR || align=right | 1.1 km || 
|-id=077 bgcolor=#E9E9E9
| 256077 ||  || — || October 19, 2006 || Catalina || CSS || — || align=right | 2.6 km || 
|-id=078 bgcolor=#E9E9E9
| 256078 ||  || — || October 21, 2006 || Kitt Peak || Spacewatch || — || align=right | 1.3 km || 
|-id=079 bgcolor=#fefefe
| 256079 ||  || — || October 21, 2006 || Kitt Peak || Spacewatch || V || align=right data-sort-value="0.74" | 740 m || 
|-id=080 bgcolor=#fefefe
| 256080 ||  || — || October 22, 2006 || Catalina || CSS || V || align=right data-sort-value="0.97" | 970 m || 
|-id=081 bgcolor=#E9E9E9
| 256081 ||  || — || October 22, 2006 || Palomar || NEAT || — || align=right | 1.5 km || 
|-id=082 bgcolor=#E9E9E9
| 256082 ||  || — || October 22, 2006 || Palomar || NEAT || — || align=right | 1.3 km || 
|-id=083 bgcolor=#E9E9E9
| 256083 ||  || — || October 22, 2006 || Palomar || NEAT || — || align=right | 1.9 km || 
|-id=084 bgcolor=#fefefe
| 256084 ||  || — || October 23, 2006 || Kitt Peak || Spacewatch || MAS || align=right | 1.0 km || 
|-id=085 bgcolor=#E9E9E9
| 256085 ||  || — || October 23, 2006 || Socorro || LINEAR || — || align=right | 3.0 km || 
|-id=086 bgcolor=#E9E9E9
| 256086 ||  || — || October 23, 2006 || Kitt Peak || Spacewatch || — || align=right | 1.4 km || 
|-id=087 bgcolor=#E9E9E9
| 256087 ||  || — || October 23, 2006 || Kitt Peak || Spacewatch || — || align=right | 2.3 km || 
|-id=088 bgcolor=#E9E9E9
| 256088 ||  || — || October 23, 2006 || Kitt Peak || Spacewatch || — || align=right | 2.2 km || 
|-id=089 bgcolor=#E9E9E9
| 256089 ||  || — || October 23, 2006 || Kitt Peak || Spacewatch || — || align=right | 1.3 km || 
|-id=090 bgcolor=#E9E9E9
| 256090 ||  || — || October 17, 2006 || Mount Lemmon || Mount Lemmon Survey || — || align=right | 1.4 km || 
|-id=091 bgcolor=#E9E9E9
| 256091 ||  || — || October 27, 2006 || Nyukasa || Mount Nyukasa Stn. || — || align=right | 1.7 km || 
|-id=092 bgcolor=#E9E9E9
| 256092 ||  || — || October 16, 2006 || Catalina || CSS || RAF || align=right | 1.2 km || 
|-id=093 bgcolor=#fefefe
| 256093 ||  || — || October 17, 2006 || Catalina || CSS || — || align=right | 1.1 km || 
|-id=094 bgcolor=#E9E9E9
| 256094 ||  || — || October 20, 2006 || Palomar || NEAT || — || align=right | 1.2 km || 
|-id=095 bgcolor=#E9E9E9
| 256095 ||  || — || October 20, 2006 || Palomar || NEAT || GER || align=right | 2.0 km || 
|-id=096 bgcolor=#E9E9E9
| 256096 ||  || — || October 22, 2006 || Mount Lemmon || Mount Lemmon Survey || — || align=right | 2.8 km || 
|-id=097 bgcolor=#E9E9E9
| 256097 ||  || — || October 23, 2006 || Kitt Peak || Spacewatch || PAD || align=right | 2.9 km || 
|-id=098 bgcolor=#E9E9E9
| 256098 ||  || — || October 27, 2006 || Mount Lemmon || Mount Lemmon Survey || — || align=right data-sort-value="0.85" | 850 m || 
|-id=099 bgcolor=#fefefe
| 256099 ||  || — || October 27, 2006 || Mount Lemmon || Mount Lemmon Survey || — || align=right | 1.1 km || 
|-id=100 bgcolor=#E9E9E9
| 256100 ||  || — || October 27, 2006 || Mount Lemmon || Mount Lemmon Survey || — || align=right | 1.2 km || 
|}

256101–256200 

|-bgcolor=#E9E9E9
| 256101 ||  || — || October 27, 2006 || Mount Lemmon || Mount Lemmon Survey || — || align=right | 1.2 km || 
|-id=102 bgcolor=#E9E9E9
| 256102 ||  || — || October 28, 2006 || Mount Lemmon || Mount Lemmon Survey || — || align=right | 2.2 km || 
|-id=103 bgcolor=#E9E9E9
| 256103 ||  || — || October 29, 2006 || Mount Lemmon || Mount Lemmon Survey || — || align=right | 2.0 km || 
|-id=104 bgcolor=#fefefe
| 256104 ||  || — || October 27, 2006 || Catalina || CSS || V || align=right data-sort-value="0.84" | 840 m || 
|-id=105 bgcolor=#E9E9E9
| 256105 ||  || — || October 27, 2006 || Catalina || CSS || WIT || align=right | 1.5 km || 
|-id=106 bgcolor=#E9E9E9
| 256106 ||  || — || October 27, 2006 || Mount Lemmon || Mount Lemmon Survey || MIS || align=right | 2.9 km || 
|-id=107 bgcolor=#E9E9E9
| 256107 ||  || — || October 27, 2006 || Mount Lemmon || Mount Lemmon Survey || — || align=right | 1.6 km || 
|-id=108 bgcolor=#E9E9E9
| 256108 ||  || — || October 27, 2006 || Kitt Peak || Spacewatch || — || align=right | 2.5 km || 
|-id=109 bgcolor=#E9E9E9
| 256109 ||  || — || October 28, 2006 || Mount Lemmon || Mount Lemmon Survey || — || align=right | 1.2 km || 
|-id=110 bgcolor=#E9E9E9
| 256110 ||  || — || October 28, 2006 || Kitt Peak || Spacewatch || BRG || align=right | 1.3 km || 
|-id=111 bgcolor=#E9E9E9
| 256111 ||  || — || October 28, 2006 || Kitt Peak || Spacewatch || — || align=right | 1.9 km || 
|-id=112 bgcolor=#E9E9E9
| 256112 ||  || — || October 28, 2006 || Kitt Peak || Spacewatch || — || align=right | 1.1 km || 
|-id=113 bgcolor=#E9E9E9
| 256113 ||  || — || October 31, 2006 || Kitt Peak || Spacewatch || — || align=right | 1.3 km || 
|-id=114 bgcolor=#E9E9E9
| 256114 ||  || — || October 22, 2006 || Siding Spring || SSS || HNS || align=right | 2.3 km || 
|-id=115 bgcolor=#fefefe
| 256115 ||  || — || October 19, 2006 || Kitt Peak || M. W. Buie || MAS || align=right data-sort-value="0.62" | 620 m || 
|-id=116 bgcolor=#fefefe
| 256116 ||  || — || October 19, 2006 || Kitt Peak || M. W. Buie || MAS || align=right data-sort-value="0.95" | 950 m || 
|-id=117 bgcolor=#fefefe
| 256117 ||  || — || October 20, 2006 || Kitt Peak || Spacewatch || NYS || align=right data-sort-value="0.79" | 790 m || 
|-id=118 bgcolor=#E9E9E9
| 256118 ||  || — || October 19, 2006 || Catalina || CSS || — || align=right | 2.6 km || 
|-id=119 bgcolor=#E9E9E9
| 256119 ||  || — || October 21, 2006 || Kitt Peak || Spacewatch || — || align=right | 1.5 km || 
|-id=120 bgcolor=#E9E9E9
| 256120 ||  || — || October 23, 2006 || Catalina || CSS || EUN || align=right | 2.0 km || 
|-id=121 bgcolor=#E9E9E9
| 256121 ||  || — || October 21, 2006 || Mount Lemmon || Mount Lemmon Survey || HOF || align=right | 2.6 km || 
|-id=122 bgcolor=#E9E9E9
| 256122 ||  || — || October 22, 2006 || Apache Point || A. C. Becker || — || align=right | 2.1 km || 
|-id=123 bgcolor=#E9E9E9
| 256123 ||  || — || October 21, 2006 || Kitt Peak || Spacewatch || — || align=right | 1.1 km || 
|-id=124 bgcolor=#E9E9E9
| 256124 ||  || — || October 20, 2006 || Mount Lemmon || Mount Lemmon Survey || EMI || align=right | 2.9 km || 
|-id=125 bgcolor=#E9E9E9
| 256125 ||  || — || October 17, 2006 || Catalina || CSS || AER || align=right | 2.0 km || 
|-id=126 bgcolor=#E9E9E9
| 256126 ||  || — || October 28, 2006 || Catalina || CSS || HNS || align=right | 1.7 km || 
|-id=127 bgcolor=#E9E9E9
| 256127 ||  || — || October 19, 2006 || Mount Lemmon || Mount Lemmon Survey || — || align=right | 2.8 km || 
|-id=128 bgcolor=#E9E9E9
| 256128 || 2006 VD || — || November 1, 2006 || Wrightwood || J. W. Young || HNS || align=right | 1.3 km || 
|-id=129 bgcolor=#E9E9E9
| 256129 ||  || — || November 2, 2006 || Mount Lemmon || Mount Lemmon Survey || — || align=right | 2.4 km || 
|-id=130 bgcolor=#E9E9E9
| 256130 ||  || — || November 9, 2006 || Kitt Peak || Spacewatch || — || align=right | 1.9 km || 
|-id=131 bgcolor=#E9E9E9
| 256131 ||  || — || November 10, 2006 || Kitt Peak || Spacewatch || — || align=right | 1.2 km || 
|-id=132 bgcolor=#E9E9E9
| 256132 ||  || — || November 10, 2006 || Kitt Peak || Spacewatch || — || align=right | 1.5 km || 
|-id=133 bgcolor=#E9E9E9
| 256133 ||  || — || November 10, 2006 || Kitt Peak || Spacewatch || — || align=right | 1.3 km || 
|-id=134 bgcolor=#E9E9E9
| 256134 ||  || — || November 11, 2006 || Catalina || CSS || — || align=right | 1.8 km || 
|-id=135 bgcolor=#E9E9E9
| 256135 ||  || — || November 11, 2006 || Kitt Peak || Spacewatch || — || align=right | 2.1 km || 
|-id=136 bgcolor=#E9E9E9
| 256136 ||  || — || November 11, 2006 || Goodricke-Pigott || R. A. Tucker || ADE || align=right | 2.9 km || 
|-id=137 bgcolor=#E9E9E9
| 256137 ||  || — || November 1, 2006 || Catalina || CSS || HNS || align=right | 2.0 km || 
|-id=138 bgcolor=#E9E9E9
| 256138 ||  || — || November 9, 2006 || Kitt Peak || Spacewatch || — || align=right | 1.3 km || 
|-id=139 bgcolor=#d6d6d6
| 256139 ||  || — || November 9, 2006 || Kitt Peak || Spacewatch || HYG || align=right | 3.9 km || 
|-id=140 bgcolor=#E9E9E9
| 256140 ||  || — || November 9, 2006 || Kitt Peak || Spacewatch || AGN || align=right | 1.4 km || 
|-id=141 bgcolor=#E9E9E9
| 256141 ||  || — || November 9, 2006 || Kitt Peak || Spacewatch || — || align=right | 1.5 km || 
|-id=142 bgcolor=#E9E9E9
| 256142 ||  || — || November 10, 2006 || Kitt Peak || Spacewatch || — || align=right | 2.4 km || 
|-id=143 bgcolor=#E9E9E9
| 256143 ||  || — || November 10, 2006 || Kitt Peak || Spacewatch || — || align=right | 1.7 km || 
|-id=144 bgcolor=#E9E9E9
| 256144 ||  || — || November 10, 2006 || Kitt Peak || Spacewatch || — || align=right | 2.5 km || 
|-id=145 bgcolor=#E9E9E9
| 256145 ||  || — || November 10, 2006 || Kitt Peak || Spacewatch || WIT || align=right | 1.0 km || 
|-id=146 bgcolor=#E9E9E9
| 256146 ||  || — || November 10, 2006 || Kitt Peak || Spacewatch || — || align=right | 1.5 km || 
|-id=147 bgcolor=#E9E9E9
| 256147 ||  || — || November 11, 2006 || Kitt Peak || Spacewatch || — || align=right data-sort-value="0.86" | 860 m || 
|-id=148 bgcolor=#E9E9E9
| 256148 ||  || — || November 11, 2006 || Kitt Peak || Spacewatch || HEN || align=right | 1.4 km || 
|-id=149 bgcolor=#fefefe
| 256149 ||  || — || November 11, 2006 || Mount Lemmon || Mount Lemmon Survey || — || align=right | 1.1 km || 
|-id=150 bgcolor=#E9E9E9
| 256150 ||  || — || November 11, 2006 || Catalina || CSS || MAR || align=right | 2.1 km || 
|-id=151 bgcolor=#E9E9E9
| 256151 ||  || — || November 11, 2006 || Catalina || CSS || — || align=right | 2.0 km || 
|-id=152 bgcolor=#E9E9E9
| 256152 ||  || — || November 11, 2006 || Catalina || CSS || — || align=right | 1.6 km || 
|-id=153 bgcolor=#E9E9E9
| 256153 ||  || — || November 12, 2006 || Mount Lemmon || Mount Lemmon Survey || — || align=right | 1.8 km || 
|-id=154 bgcolor=#E9E9E9
| 256154 ||  || — || November 13, 2006 || Kitt Peak || Spacewatch || RAF || align=right | 1.6 km || 
|-id=155 bgcolor=#FA8072
| 256155 ||  || — || November 15, 2006 || Socorro || LINEAR || — || align=right | 2.5 km || 
|-id=156 bgcolor=#E9E9E9
| 256156 ||  || — || November 10, 2006 || Kitt Peak || Spacewatch || — || align=right | 1.3 km || 
|-id=157 bgcolor=#E9E9E9
| 256157 ||  || — || November 10, 2006 || Kitt Peak || Spacewatch || — || align=right | 1.2 km || 
|-id=158 bgcolor=#E9E9E9
| 256158 ||  || — || November 10, 2006 || Kitt Peak || Spacewatch || — || align=right | 2.2 km || 
|-id=159 bgcolor=#E9E9E9
| 256159 ||  || — || November 10, 2006 || Kitt Peak || Spacewatch || — || align=right | 1.6 km || 
|-id=160 bgcolor=#E9E9E9
| 256160 ||  || — || November 10, 2006 || Kitt Peak || Spacewatch || — || align=right | 1.6 km || 
|-id=161 bgcolor=#E9E9E9
| 256161 ||  || — || November 11, 2006 || Kitt Peak || Spacewatch || — || align=right | 1.8 km || 
|-id=162 bgcolor=#E9E9E9
| 256162 ||  || — || November 11, 2006 || Kitt Peak || Spacewatch || — || align=right | 1.9 km || 
|-id=163 bgcolor=#E9E9E9
| 256163 ||  || — || November 11, 2006 || Kitt Peak || Spacewatch || — || align=right | 1.4 km || 
|-id=164 bgcolor=#d6d6d6
| 256164 ||  || — || November 11, 2006 || Kitt Peak || Spacewatch || CHA || align=right | 2.7 km || 
|-id=165 bgcolor=#E9E9E9
| 256165 ||  || — || November 11, 2006 || Kitt Peak || Spacewatch || — || align=right | 1.4 km || 
|-id=166 bgcolor=#fefefe
| 256166 ||  || — || November 11, 2006 || Kitt Peak || Spacewatch || ERI || align=right | 3.0 km || 
|-id=167 bgcolor=#E9E9E9
| 256167 ||  || — || November 11, 2006 || Kitt Peak || Spacewatch || RAF || align=right data-sort-value="0.91" | 910 m || 
|-id=168 bgcolor=#E9E9E9
| 256168 ||  || — || November 11, 2006 || Kitt Peak || Spacewatch || — || align=right | 2.0 km || 
|-id=169 bgcolor=#E9E9E9
| 256169 ||  || — || November 11, 2006 || Kitt Peak || Spacewatch || — || align=right | 2.2 km || 
|-id=170 bgcolor=#E9E9E9
| 256170 ||  || — || November 11, 2006 || Kitt Peak || Spacewatch || — || align=right | 2.0 km || 
|-id=171 bgcolor=#E9E9E9
| 256171 ||  || — || November 11, 2006 || Kitt Peak || Spacewatch || — || align=right | 1.1 km || 
|-id=172 bgcolor=#E9E9E9
| 256172 ||  || — || November 11, 2006 || Kitt Peak || Spacewatch || HEN || align=right | 1.3 km || 
|-id=173 bgcolor=#E9E9E9
| 256173 ||  || — || November 11, 2006 || Kitt Peak || Spacewatch || — || align=right | 1.8 km || 
|-id=174 bgcolor=#E9E9E9
| 256174 ||  || — || November 11, 2006 || Kitt Peak || Spacewatch || EUN || align=right | 2.0 km || 
|-id=175 bgcolor=#E9E9E9
| 256175 ||  || — || November 11, 2006 || Kitt Peak || Spacewatch || EUN || align=right | 1.8 km || 
|-id=176 bgcolor=#E9E9E9
| 256176 ||  || — || November 11, 2006 || Kitt Peak || Spacewatch || MIS || align=right | 2.1 km || 
|-id=177 bgcolor=#E9E9E9
| 256177 ||  || — || November 11, 2006 || Catalina || CSS || — || align=right | 2.3 km || 
|-id=178 bgcolor=#E9E9E9
| 256178 ||  || — || November 11, 2006 || Catalina || CSS || ADE || align=right | 3.3 km || 
|-id=179 bgcolor=#E9E9E9
| 256179 ||  || — || November 11, 2006 || Kitt Peak || Spacewatch || — || align=right | 2.4 km || 
|-id=180 bgcolor=#E9E9E9
| 256180 ||  || — || November 11, 2006 || Mount Lemmon || Mount Lemmon Survey || — || align=right | 1.3 km || 
|-id=181 bgcolor=#E9E9E9
| 256181 ||  || — || November 11, 2006 || Mount Lemmon || Mount Lemmon Survey || — || align=right | 1.5 km || 
|-id=182 bgcolor=#E9E9E9
| 256182 ||  || — || November 11, 2006 || Mount Lemmon || Mount Lemmon Survey || JUN || align=right | 1.5 km || 
|-id=183 bgcolor=#E9E9E9
| 256183 ||  || — || November 11, 2006 || Kitt Peak || Spacewatch || — || align=right | 1.9 km || 
|-id=184 bgcolor=#E9E9E9
| 256184 ||  || — || November 11, 2006 || Mount Lemmon || Mount Lemmon Survey || — || align=right | 2.4 km || 
|-id=185 bgcolor=#E9E9E9
| 256185 ||  || — || November 11, 2006 || Kitt Peak || Spacewatch || — || align=right | 1.5 km || 
|-id=186 bgcolor=#E9E9E9
| 256186 ||  || — || November 12, 2006 || Mount Lemmon || Mount Lemmon Survey || RAF || align=right | 1.3 km || 
|-id=187 bgcolor=#E9E9E9
| 256187 ||  || — || November 12, 2006 || Mount Lemmon || Mount Lemmon Survey || JUN || align=right | 4.0 km || 
|-id=188 bgcolor=#E9E9E9
| 256188 ||  || — || November 12, 2006 || Mount Lemmon || Mount Lemmon Survey || — || align=right | 1.3 km || 
|-id=189 bgcolor=#E9E9E9
| 256189 ||  || — || November 12, 2006 || Mount Lemmon || Mount Lemmon Survey || — || align=right | 1.2 km || 
|-id=190 bgcolor=#E9E9E9
| 256190 ||  || — || November 13, 2006 || Mount Lemmon || Mount Lemmon Survey || RAF || align=right | 1.6 km || 
|-id=191 bgcolor=#E9E9E9
| 256191 ||  || — || November 13, 2006 || Mount Lemmon || Mount Lemmon Survey || EUN || align=right | 1.4 km || 
|-id=192 bgcolor=#E9E9E9
| 256192 ||  || — || November 14, 2006 || Kitt Peak || Spacewatch || HEN || align=right | 1.2 km || 
|-id=193 bgcolor=#E9E9E9
| 256193 ||  || — || November 14, 2006 || Catalina || CSS || — || align=right | 1.7 km || 
|-id=194 bgcolor=#E9E9E9
| 256194 ||  || — || November 14, 2006 || Mount Lemmon || Mount Lemmon Survey || — || align=right | 1.2 km || 
|-id=195 bgcolor=#E9E9E9
| 256195 ||  || — || November 14, 2006 || Socorro || LINEAR || — || align=right | 2.2 km || 
|-id=196 bgcolor=#E9E9E9
| 256196 ||  || — || November 14, 2006 || Socorro || LINEAR || — || align=right | 2.2 km || 
|-id=197 bgcolor=#E9E9E9
| 256197 ||  || — || November 14, 2006 || Socorro || LINEAR || — || align=right | 3.4 km || 
|-id=198 bgcolor=#E9E9E9
| 256198 ||  || — || November 14, 2006 || Kitt Peak || Spacewatch || NEM || align=right | 2.4 km || 
|-id=199 bgcolor=#E9E9E9
| 256199 ||  || — || November 14, 2006 || Socorro || LINEAR || — || align=right | 2.1 km || 
|-id=200 bgcolor=#E9E9E9
| 256200 ||  || — || November 15, 2006 || Mount Lemmon || Mount Lemmon Survey || — || align=right | 1.8 km || 
|}

256201–256300 

|-bgcolor=#E9E9E9
| 256201 ||  || — || November 15, 2006 || Mount Lemmon || Mount Lemmon Survey || — || align=right | 1.1 km || 
|-id=202 bgcolor=#E9E9E9
| 256202 ||  || — || November 15, 2006 || Mount Lemmon || Mount Lemmon Survey || — || align=right | 2.1 km || 
|-id=203 bgcolor=#E9E9E9
| 256203 ||  || — || November 15, 2006 || Mount Lemmon || Mount Lemmon Survey || GEF || align=right | 1.6 km || 
|-id=204 bgcolor=#fefefe
| 256204 ||  || — || November 15, 2006 || Kitt Peak || Spacewatch || — || align=right | 1.2 km || 
|-id=205 bgcolor=#E9E9E9
| 256205 ||  || — || November 10, 2006 || Kitt Peak || Spacewatch || HNS || align=right | 1.5 km || 
|-id=206 bgcolor=#E9E9E9
| 256206 ||  || — || November 10, 2006 || Kitt Peak || Spacewatch || — || align=right | 2.1 km || 
|-id=207 bgcolor=#E9E9E9
| 256207 ||  || — || November 12, 2006 || Mount Lemmon || Mount Lemmon Survey || — || align=right | 1.8 km || 
|-id=208 bgcolor=#E9E9E9
| 256208 ||  || — || November 12, 2006 || Lulin Observatory || H.-C. Lin, Q.-z. Ye || — || align=right | 1.6 km || 
|-id=209 bgcolor=#E9E9E9
| 256209 ||  || — || November 12, 2006 || Lulin || H.-C. Lin, Q.-z. Ye || — || align=right | 1.5 km || 
|-id=210 bgcolor=#E9E9E9
| 256210 ||  || — || November 13, 2006 || Kitt Peak || Spacewatch || — || align=right | 1.8 km || 
|-id=211 bgcolor=#d6d6d6
| 256211 ||  || — || November 13, 2006 || Kitt Peak || Spacewatch || — || align=right | 2.9 km || 
|-id=212 bgcolor=#E9E9E9
| 256212 ||  || — || November 13, 2006 || Catalina || CSS || — || align=right | 2.1 km || 
|-id=213 bgcolor=#E9E9E9
| 256213 ||  || — || November 13, 2006 || Mount Lemmon || Mount Lemmon Survey || — || align=right | 3.4 km || 
|-id=214 bgcolor=#E9E9E9
| 256214 ||  || — || November 14, 2006 || Kitt Peak || Spacewatch || — || align=right | 1.8 km || 
|-id=215 bgcolor=#E9E9E9
| 256215 ||  || — || November 14, 2006 || Kitt Peak || Spacewatch || — || align=right | 1.4 km || 
|-id=216 bgcolor=#E9E9E9
| 256216 ||  || — || November 14, 2006 || Socorro || LINEAR || — || align=right | 1.9 km || 
|-id=217 bgcolor=#E9E9E9
| 256217 ||  || — || November 14, 2006 || Kitt Peak || Spacewatch || — || align=right | 1.5 km || 
|-id=218 bgcolor=#E9E9E9
| 256218 ||  || — || November 14, 2006 || Socorro || LINEAR || — || align=right | 2.9 km || 
|-id=219 bgcolor=#E9E9E9
| 256219 ||  || — || November 14, 2006 || Kitt Peak || Spacewatch || — || align=right | 2.0 km || 
|-id=220 bgcolor=#E9E9E9
| 256220 ||  || — || November 15, 2006 || Kitt Peak || Spacewatch || — || align=right | 2.1 km || 
|-id=221 bgcolor=#fefefe
| 256221 ||  || — || November 15, 2006 || Kitt Peak || Spacewatch || — || align=right | 1.1 km || 
|-id=222 bgcolor=#E9E9E9
| 256222 ||  || — || November 15, 2006 || Mount Lemmon || Mount Lemmon Survey || — || align=right | 1.3 km || 
|-id=223 bgcolor=#E9E9E9
| 256223 ||  || — || November 15, 2006 || Kitt Peak || Spacewatch || — || align=right | 1.3 km || 
|-id=224 bgcolor=#E9E9E9
| 256224 ||  || — || November 15, 2006 || Kitt Peak || Spacewatch || — || align=right | 1.3 km || 
|-id=225 bgcolor=#E9E9E9
| 256225 ||  || — || November 15, 2006 || Catalina || CSS || — || align=right | 1.4 km || 
|-id=226 bgcolor=#E9E9E9
| 256226 ||  || — || November 15, 2006 || Kitt Peak || Spacewatch || — || align=right | 1.9 km || 
|-id=227 bgcolor=#E9E9E9
| 256227 ||  || — || November 15, 2006 || Mount Lemmon || Mount Lemmon Survey || WIT || align=right | 1.7 km || 
|-id=228 bgcolor=#E9E9E9
| 256228 ||  || — || November 15, 2006 || Mount Lemmon || Mount Lemmon Survey || — || align=right | 1.5 km || 
|-id=229 bgcolor=#E9E9E9
| 256229 ||  || — || November 15, 2006 || Catalina || CSS || JUN || align=right | 1.4 km || 
|-id=230 bgcolor=#E9E9E9
| 256230 ||  || — || November 2, 2006 || Catalina || CSS || — || align=right | 2.4 km || 
|-id=231 bgcolor=#E9E9E9
| 256231 ||  || — || November 9, 2006 || Palomar || NEAT || — || align=right | 2.0 km || 
|-id=232 bgcolor=#E9E9E9
| 256232 ||  || — || November 9, 2006 || Palomar || NEAT || — || align=right | 1.3 km || 
|-id=233 bgcolor=#E9E9E9
| 256233 ||  || — || November 9, 2006 || Palomar || NEAT || — || align=right | 3.6 km || 
|-id=234 bgcolor=#E9E9E9
| 256234 ||  || — || November 9, 2006 || Palomar || NEAT || MIS || align=right | 4.0 km || 
|-id=235 bgcolor=#E9E9E9
| 256235 ||  || — || November 8, 2006 || Palomar || NEAT || WIT || align=right | 1.6 km || 
|-id=236 bgcolor=#E9E9E9
| 256236 ||  || — || November 8, 2006 || Palomar || NEAT || AST || align=right | 3.2 km || 
|-id=237 bgcolor=#E9E9E9
| 256237 ||  || — || November 12, 2006 || Catalina || CSS || — || align=right | 1.3 km || 
|-id=238 bgcolor=#E9E9E9
| 256238 || 2006 WD || — || November 16, 2006 || 7300 Observatory || W. K. Y. Yeung || — || align=right | 1.8 km || 
|-id=239 bgcolor=#E9E9E9
| 256239 ||  || — || November 16, 2006 || Kitt Peak || Spacewatch || — || align=right | 2.1 km || 
|-id=240 bgcolor=#E9E9E9
| 256240 ||  || — || November 16, 2006 || Mount Lemmon || Mount Lemmon Survey || — || align=right | 1.9 km || 
|-id=241 bgcolor=#E9E9E9
| 256241 ||  || — || November 16, 2006 || Mount Lemmon || Mount Lemmon Survey || AGN || align=right | 1.5 km || 
|-id=242 bgcolor=#E9E9E9
| 256242 ||  || — || November 16, 2006 || Mount Lemmon || Mount Lemmon Survey || — || align=right | 3.0 km || 
|-id=243 bgcolor=#E9E9E9
| 256243 ||  || — || November 16, 2006 || Lulin Observatory || M.-T. Chang, Q.-z. Ye || — || align=right | 2.2 km || 
|-id=244 bgcolor=#E9E9E9
| 256244 ||  || — || November 17, 2006 || Kitt Peak || Spacewatch || — || align=right | 2.6 km || 
|-id=245 bgcolor=#E9E9E9
| 256245 ||  || — || November 17, 2006 || Mount Lemmon || Mount Lemmon Survey || — || align=right | 1.3 km || 
|-id=246 bgcolor=#E9E9E9
| 256246 ||  || — || November 17, 2006 || Mount Lemmon || Mount Lemmon Survey || — || align=right | 2.0 km || 
|-id=247 bgcolor=#E9E9E9
| 256247 ||  || — || November 18, 2006 || Socorro || LINEAR || — || align=right | 1.3 km || 
|-id=248 bgcolor=#E9E9E9
| 256248 ||  || — || November 18, 2006 || Kitt Peak || Spacewatch || — || align=right | 2.2 km || 
|-id=249 bgcolor=#E9E9E9
| 256249 ||  || — || November 22, 2006 || 7300 || W. K. Y. Yeung || — || align=right | 3.9 km || 
|-id=250 bgcolor=#E9E9E9
| 256250 ||  || — || November 22, 2006 || 7300 || W. K. Y. Yeung || — || align=right | 1.6 km || 
|-id=251 bgcolor=#E9E9E9
| 256251 ||  || — || November 22, 2006 || 7300 || W. K. Y. Yeung || — || align=right | 1.2 km || 
|-id=252 bgcolor=#E9E9E9
| 256252 ||  || — || November 19, 2006 || Kitt Peak || Spacewatch || — || align=right | 1.6 km || 
|-id=253 bgcolor=#E9E9E9
| 256253 ||  || — || November 16, 2006 || Kitt Peak || Spacewatch || — || align=right | 2.2 km || 
|-id=254 bgcolor=#E9E9E9
| 256254 ||  || — || November 16, 2006 || Kitt Peak || Spacewatch || — || align=right | 2.2 km || 
|-id=255 bgcolor=#E9E9E9
| 256255 ||  || — || November 16, 2006 || Kitt Peak || Spacewatch || — || align=right | 1.8 km || 
|-id=256 bgcolor=#E9E9E9
| 256256 ||  || — || November 16, 2006 || Mount Lemmon || Mount Lemmon Survey || — || align=right | 1.6 km || 
|-id=257 bgcolor=#E9E9E9
| 256257 ||  || — || November 16, 2006 || Mount Lemmon || Mount Lemmon Survey || — || align=right | 1.4 km || 
|-id=258 bgcolor=#E9E9E9
| 256258 ||  || — || November 16, 2006 || Kitt Peak || Spacewatch || — || align=right | 2.9 km || 
|-id=259 bgcolor=#E9E9E9
| 256259 ||  || — || November 16, 2006 || Kitt Peak || Spacewatch || — || align=right | 2.6 km || 
|-id=260 bgcolor=#E9E9E9
| 256260 ||  || — || November 16, 2006 || Kitt Peak || Spacewatch || — || align=right | 1.2 km || 
|-id=261 bgcolor=#E9E9E9
| 256261 ||  || — || November 16, 2006 || Kitt Peak || Spacewatch || WIT || align=right | 1.3 km || 
|-id=262 bgcolor=#E9E9E9
| 256262 ||  || — || November 17, 2006 || Mount Lemmon || Mount Lemmon Survey || — || align=right | 2.1 km || 
|-id=263 bgcolor=#E9E9E9
| 256263 ||  || — || November 17, 2006 || Mount Lemmon || Mount Lemmon Survey || — || align=right | 1.5 km || 
|-id=264 bgcolor=#E9E9E9
| 256264 ||  || — || November 18, 2006 || Kitt Peak || Spacewatch || HEN || align=right | 1.4 km || 
|-id=265 bgcolor=#E9E9E9
| 256265 ||  || — || November 18, 2006 || Kitt Peak || Spacewatch || — || align=right | 2.4 km || 
|-id=266 bgcolor=#E9E9E9
| 256266 ||  || — || November 18, 2006 || Kitt Peak || Spacewatch || — || align=right | 3.2 km || 
|-id=267 bgcolor=#E9E9E9
| 256267 ||  || — || November 18, 2006 || Kitt Peak || Spacewatch || HEN || align=right | 1.2 km || 
|-id=268 bgcolor=#E9E9E9
| 256268 ||  || — || November 18, 2006 || Kitt Peak || Spacewatch || HEN || align=right | 1.2 km || 
|-id=269 bgcolor=#E9E9E9
| 256269 ||  || — || November 18, 2006 || Kitt Peak || Spacewatch || — || align=right | 2.9 km || 
|-id=270 bgcolor=#E9E9E9
| 256270 ||  || — || November 18, 2006 || Kitt Peak || Spacewatch || — || align=right | 2.6 km || 
|-id=271 bgcolor=#E9E9E9
| 256271 ||  || — || November 18, 2006 || Mount Lemmon || Mount Lemmon Survey || — || align=right | 1.5 km || 
|-id=272 bgcolor=#d6d6d6
| 256272 ||  || — || November 18, 2006 || Kitt Peak || Spacewatch || — || align=right | 3.8 km || 
|-id=273 bgcolor=#E9E9E9
| 256273 ||  || — || November 18, 2006 || Mount Lemmon || Mount Lemmon Survey || — || align=right | 1.7 km || 
|-id=274 bgcolor=#E9E9E9
| 256274 ||  || — || November 19, 2006 || Kitt Peak || Spacewatch || INO || align=right | 1.4 km || 
|-id=275 bgcolor=#E9E9E9
| 256275 ||  || — || November 19, 2006 || Kitt Peak || Spacewatch || — || align=right | 1.6 km || 
|-id=276 bgcolor=#E9E9E9
| 256276 ||  || — || November 19, 2006 || Kitt Peak || Spacewatch || EUN || align=right | 1.4 km || 
|-id=277 bgcolor=#E9E9E9
| 256277 ||  || — || November 19, 2006 || Kitt Peak || Spacewatch || — || align=right | 2.1 km || 
|-id=278 bgcolor=#E9E9E9
| 256278 ||  || — || November 19, 2006 || Kitt Peak || Spacewatch || — || align=right | 1.9 km || 
|-id=279 bgcolor=#E9E9E9
| 256279 ||  || — || November 19, 2006 || Kitt Peak || Spacewatch || — || align=right | 2.5 km || 
|-id=280 bgcolor=#E9E9E9
| 256280 ||  || — || November 19, 2006 || Kitt Peak || Spacewatch || AGN || align=right | 1.7 km || 
|-id=281 bgcolor=#E9E9E9
| 256281 ||  || — || November 19, 2006 || Kitt Peak || Spacewatch || — || align=right | 2.0 km || 
|-id=282 bgcolor=#E9E9E9
| 256282 ||  || — || November 19, 2006 || Kitt Peak || Spacewatch || — || align=right data-sort-value="0.97" | 970 m || 
|-id=283 bgcolor=#E9E9E9
| 256283 ||  || — || November 19, 2006 || Kitt Peak || Spacewatch || — || align=right | 1.7 km || 
|-id=284 bgcolor=#E9E9E9
| 256284 ||  || — || November 20, 2006 || Socorro || LINEAR || — || align=right | 2.5 km || 
|-id=285 bgcolor=#E9E9E9
| 256285 ||  || — || November 20, 2006 || Socorro || LINEAR || — || align=right | 2.0 km || 
|-id=286 bgcolor=#E9E9E9
| 256286 ||  || — || November 20, 2006 || Socorro || LINEAR || — || align=right | 1.8 km || 
|-id=287 bgcolor=#E9E9E9
| 256287 ||  || — || November 21, 2006 || Socorro || LINEAR || — || align=right | 1.9 km || 
|-id=288 bgcolor=#E9E9E9
| 256288 ||  || — || November 22, 2006 || Mount Lemmon || Mount Lemmon Survey || MAR || align=right | 1.1 km || 
|-id=289 bgcolor=#d6d6d6
| 256289 ||  || — || November 22, 2006 || Mount Lemmon || Mount Lemmon Survey || — || align=right | 3.2 km || 
|-id=290 bgcolor=#E9E9E9
| 256290 ||  || — || November 26, 2006 || 7300 || W. K. Y. Yeung || — || align=right | 1.6 km || 
|-id=291 bgcolor=#E9E9E9
| 256291 ||  || — || November 26, 2006 || Bergisch Gladbac || W. Bickel || — || align=right | 1.2 km || 
|-id=292 bgcolor=#E9E9E9
| 256292 ||  || — || November 28, 2006 || 7300 || W. K. Y. Yeung || — || align=right | 2.4 km || 
|-id=293 bgcolor=#E9E9E9
| 256293 ||  || — || November 18, 2006 || Kitt Peak || Spacewatch || WIT || align=right | 1.4 km || 
|-id=294 bgcolor=#E9E9E9
| 256294 ||  || — || November 18, 2006 || Kitt Peak || Spacewatch || — || align=right | 2.0 km || 
|-id=295 bgcolor=#E9E9E9
| 256295 ||  || — || November 18, 2006 || Mount Lemmon || Mount Lemmon Survey || RAF || align=right | 1.3 km || 
|-id=296 bgcolor=#E9E9E9
| 256296 ||  || — || November 18, 2006 || Catalina || CSS || — || align=right | 1.7 km || 
|-id=297 bgcolor=#E9E9E9
| 256297 ||  || — || November 19, 2006 || Kitt Peak || Spacewatch || — || align=right | 2.2 km || 
|-id=298 bgcolor=#E9E9E9
| 256298 ||  || — || November 19, 2006 || Socorro || LINEAR || WIT || align=right | 1.4 km || 
|-id=299 bgcolor=#E9E9E9
| 256299 ||  || — || November 19, 2006 || Kitt Peak || Spacewatch || — || align=right | 1.3 km || 
|-id=300 bgcolor=#E9E9E9
| 256300 ||  || — || November 19, 2006 || 7300 || W. K. Y. Yeung || — || align=right | 3.7 km || 
|}

256301–256400 

|-bgcolor=#E9E9E9
| 256301 ||  || — || November 20, 2006 || Kitt Peak || Spacewatch || — || align=right | 1.1 km || 
|-id=302 bgcolor=#E9E9E9
| 256302 ||  || — || November 23, 2006 || Kitt Peak || Spacewatch || MIS || align=right | 2.4 km || 
|-id=303 bgcolor=#d6d6d6
| 256303 ||  || — || November 23, 2006 || Kitt Peak || Spacewatch || — || align=right | 3.5 km || 
|-id=304 bgcolor=#E9E9E9
| 256304 ||  || — || November 23, 2006 || Kitt Peak || Spacewatch || — || align=right | 2.1 km || 
|-id=305 bgcolor=#d6d6d6
| 256305 ||  || — || November 23, 2006 || Mount Lemmon || Mount Lemmon Survey || — || align=right | 4.6 km || 
|-id=306 bgcolor=#E9E9E9
| 256306 ||  || — || November 25, 2006 || Mount Lemmon || Mount Lemmon Survey || — || align=right | 3.1 km || 
|-id=307 bgcolor=#E9E9E9
| 256307 ||  || — || November 16, 2006 || Catalina || CSS || — || align=right | 1.4 km || 
|-id=308 bgcolor=#E9E9E9
| 256308 ||  || — || November 16, 2006 || Catalina || CSS || MIT || align=right | 2.6 km || 
|-id=309 bgcolor=#E9E9E9
| 256309 ||  || — || November 17, 2006 || Palomar || NEAT || — || align=right | 1.3 km || 
|-id=310 bgcolor=#E9E9E9
| 256310 ||  || — || November 17, 2006 || Palomar || NEAT || — || align=right | 3.6 km || 
|-id=311 bgcolor=#E9E9E9
| 256311 ||  || — || November 25, 2006 || Mount Lemmon || Mount Lemmon Survey || — || align=right | 2.2 km || 
|-id=312 bgcolor=#E9E9E9
| 256312 ||  || — || November 25, 2006 || Kitt Peak || Spacewatch || — || align=right | 2.8 km || 
|-id=313 bgcolor=#fefefe
| 256313 ||  || — || November 27, 2006 || Catalina || CSS || — || align=right | 1.3 km || 
|-id=314 bgcolor=#E9E9E9
| 256314 ||  || — || November 27, 2006 || Kitt Peak || Spacewatch || — || align=right | 2.1 km || 
|-id=315 bgcolor=#d6d6d6
| 256315 ||  || — || November 27, 2006 || Mount Lemmon || Mount Lemmon Survey || — || align=right | 4.3 km || 
|-id=316 bgcolor=#E9E9E9
| 256316 ||  || — || November 27, 2006 || Kitt Peak || Spacewatch || — || align=right | 2.7 km || 
|-id=317 bgcolor=#d6d6d6
| 256317 ||  || — || November 27, 2006 || Kitt Peak || Spacewatch || — || align=right | 4.8 km || 
|-id=318 bgcolor=#E9E9E9
| 256318 ||  || — || November 17, 2006 || Kitt Peak || Spacewatch || — || align=right | 4.1 km || 
|-id=319 bgcolor=#E9E9E9
| 256319 ||  || — || December 14, 2006 || Cordell-Lorenz || Cordell–Lorenz Obs. || — || align=right | 1.2 km || 
|-id=320 bgcolor=#E9E9E9
| 256320 ||  || — || December 5, 2006 || Palomar || NEAT || — || align=right | 1.7 km || 
|-id=321 bgcolor=#E9E9E9
| 256321 ||  || — || December 9, 2006 || Palomar || NEAT || — || align=right | 3.2 km || 
|-id=322 bgcolor=#E9E9E9
| 256322 ||  || — || December 9, 2006 || Palomar || NEAT || — || align=right | 2.7 km || 
|-id=323 bgcolor=#E9E9E9
| 256323 ||  || — || December 9, 2006 || Kitt Peak || Spacewatch || HEN || align=right | 1.1 km || 
|-id=324 bgcolor=#E9E9E9
| 256324 ||  || — || December 10, 2006 || Kitt Peak || Spacewatch || — || align=right | 2.7 km || 
|-id=325 bgcolor=#E9E9E9
| 256325 ||  || — || December 10, 2006 || Kitt Peak || Spacewatch || — || align=right | 3.4 km || 
|-id=326 bgcolor=#E9E9E9
| 256326 ||  || — || December 10, 2006 || Kitt Peak || Spacewatch || — || align=right | 1.6 km || 
|-id=327 bgcolor=#E9E9E9
| 256327 ||  || — || December 10, 2006 || Kitt Peak || Spacewatch || — || align=right | 2.1 km || 
|-id=328 bgcolor=#E9E9E9
| 256328 ||  || — || December 12, 2006 || Socorro || LINEAR || — || align=right | 3.0 km || 
|-id=329 bgcolor=#E9E9E9
| 256329 ||  || — || December 12, 2006 || Kitt Peak || Spacewatch || HEN || align=right | 1.5 km || 
|-id=330 bgcolor=#E9E9E9
| 256330 ||  || — || December 12, 2006 || Mount Lemmon || Mount Lemmon Survey || — || align=right | 2.2 km || 
|-id=331 bgcolor=#E9E9E9
| 256331 ||  || — || December 12, 2006 || Catalina || CSS || HEN || align=right | 1.5 km || 
|-id=332 bgcolor=#E9E9E9
| 256332 ||  || — || December 12, 2006 || Catalina || CSS || — || align=right | 1.5 km || 
|-id=333 bgcolor=#E9E9E9
| 256333 ||  || — || December 13, 2006 || Kitt Peak || Spacewatch || — || align=right | 3.4 km || 
|-id=334 bgcolor=#E9E9E9
| 256334 ||  || — || December 13, 2006 || Kitt Peak || Spacewatch || — || align=right | 3.9 km || 
|-id=335 bgcolor=#E9E9E9
| 256335 ||  || — || December 13, 2006 || Kitt Peak || Spacewatch || — || align=right | 1.8 km || 
|-id=336 bgcolor=#E9E9E9
| 256336 ||  || — || December 13, 2006 || Kitt Peak || Spacewatch || — || align=right | 3.2 km || 
|-id=337 bgcolor=#E9E9E9
| 256337 ||  || — || December 13, 2006 || Catalina || CSS || — || align=right | 2.2 km || 
|-id=338 bgcolor=#E9E9E9
| 256338 ||  || — || December 13, 2006 || Mount Lemmon || Mount Lemmon Survey || MAR || align=right | 1.5 km || 
|-id=339 bgcolor=#E9E9E9
| 256339 ||  || — || December 13, 2006 || Mount Lemmon || Mount Lemmon Survey || — || align=right | 2.0 km || 
|-id=340 bgcolor=#d6d6d6
| 256340 ||  || — || December 13, 2006 || Kitt Peak || Spacewatch || K-2 || align=right | 1.5 km || 
|-id=341 bgcolor=#E9E9E9
| 256341 ||  || — || December 10, 2006 || Pla D'Arguines || R. Ferrando || — || align=right | 1.0 km || 
|-id=342 bgcolor=#E9E9E9
| 256342 ||  || — || December 11, 2006 || Kitt Peak || Spacewatch || HOF || align=right | 5.2 km || 
|-id=343 bgcolor=#E9E9E9
| 256343 ||  || — || December 11, 2006 || Catalina || CSS || — || align=right | 2.0 km || 
|-id=344 bgcolor=#E9E9E9
| 256344 ||  || — || December 11, 2006 || Kitt Peak || Spacewatch || — || align=right | 1.7 km || 
|-id=345 bgcolor=#d6d6d6
| 256345 ||  || — || December 11, 2006 || Kitt Peak || Spacewatch || — || align=right | 2.8 km || 
|-id=346 bgcolor=#E9E9E9
| 256346 ||  || — || December 12, 2006 || Kitt Peak || Spacewatch || AGN || align=right | 1.6 km || 
|-id=347 bgcolor=#d6d6d6
| 256347 ||  || — || December 12, 2006 || Mount Lemmon || Mount Lemmon Survey || K-2 || align=right | 2.0 km || 
|-id=348 bgcolor=#E9E9E9
| 256348 ||  || — || December 12, 2006 || Mount Lemmon || Mount Lemmon Survey || — || align=right | 2.0 km || 
|-id=349 bgcolor=#E9E9E9
| 256349 ||  || — || December 12, 2006 || Mount Lemmon || Mount Lemmon Survey || — || align=right | 4.5 km || 
|-id=350 bgcolor=#E9E9E9
| 256350 ||  || — || December 13, 2006 || Catalina || CSS || — || align=right | 1.7 km || 
|-id=351 bgcolor=#E9E9E9
| 256351 ||  || — || December 13, 2006 || Kitt Peak || Spacewatch || INO || align=right | 1.7 km || 
|-id=352 bgcolor=#E9E9E9
| 256352 ||  || — || December 13, 2006 || Socorro || LINEAR || MRX || align=right | 1.5 km || 
|-id=353 bgcolor=#E9E9E9
| 256353 ||  || — || December 15, 2006 || Socorro || LINEAR || — || align=right | 3.7 km || 
|-id=354 bgcolor=#E9E9E9
| 256354 ||  || — || December 15, 2006 || Catalina || CSS || — || align=right | 1.5 km || 
|-id=355 bgcolor=#E9E9E9
| 256355 ||  || — || December 11, 2006 || Socorro || LINEAR || — || align=right | 5.0 km || 
|-id=356 bgcolor=#E9E9E9
| 256356 ||  || — || December 13, 2006 || Catalina || CSS || — || align=right | 1.6 km || 
|-id=357 bgcolor=#E9E9E9
| 256357 ||  || — || December 14, 2006 || Catalina || CSS || slow || align=right | 2.2 km || 
|-id=358 bgcolor=#E9E9E9
| 256358 ||  || — || December 14, 2006 || Mount Lemmon || Mount Lemmon Survey || GER || align=right | 2.4 km || 
|-id=359 bgcolor=#E9E9E9
| 256359 ||  || — || December 14, 2006 || Kitt Peak || Spacewatch || — || align=right | 2.3 km || 
|-id=360 bgcolor=#d6d6d6
| 256360 ||  || — || December 14, 2006 || Kitt Peak || Spacewatch || CHA || align=right | 3.0 km || 
|-id=361 bgcolor=#E9E9E9
| 256361 ||  || — || December 14, 2006 || Kitt Peak || Spacewatch || DOR || align=right | 2.4 km || 
|-id=362 bgcolor=#E9E9E9
| 256362 ||  || — || December 12, 2006 || Palomar || NEAT || — || align=right | 1.9 km || 
|-id=363 bgcolor=#E9E9E9
| 256363 ||  || — || December 12, 2006 || Socorro || LINEAR || — || align=right | 3.6 km || 
|-id=364 bgcolor=#E9E9E9
| 256364 ||  || — || December 12, 2006 || Palomar || NEAT || — || align=right | 1.3 km || 
|-id=365 bgcolor=#E9E9E9
| 256365 ||  || — || December 12, 2006 || Palomar || NEAT || MAR || align=right | 1.6 km || 
|-id=366 bgcolor=#E9E9E9
| 256366 ||  || — || December 12, 2006 || Palomar || NEAT || — || align=right | 4.3 km || 
|-id=367 bgcolor=#E9E9E9
| 256367 ||  || — || December 14, 2006 || Palomar || NEAT || — || align=right | 2.6 km || 
|-id=368 bgcolor=#E9E9E9
| 256368 ||  || — || December 22, 2006 || 7300 || W. K. Y. Yeung || — || align=right | 1.6 km || 
|-id=369 bgcolor=#E9E9E9
| 256369 Vilain ||  ||  || December 20, 2006 || Saint-Sulpice || B. Christophe || — || align=right | 1.3 km || 
|-id=370 bgcolor=#d6d6d6
| 256370 ||  || — || December 16, 2006 || Socorro || LINEAR || — || align=right | 5.0 km || 
|-id=371 bgcolor=#E9E9E9
| 256371 ||  || — || December 17, 2006 || Mount Lemmon || Mount Lemmon Survey || — || align=right | 1.3 km || 
|-id=372 bgcolor=#E9E9E9
| 256372 ||  || — || December 21, 2006 || Kitt Peak || Spacewatch || — || align=right | 1.4 km || 
|-id=373 bgcolor=#E9E9E9
| 256373 ||  || — || December 21, 2006 || Mount Lemmon || Mount Lemmon Survey || — || align=right | 4.1 km || 
|-id=374 bgcolor=#E9E9E9
| 256374 Danielpequignot ||  ||  || December 22, 2006 || Saint-Sulpice || B. Christophe || — || align=right | 2.6 km || 
|-id=375 bgcolor=#E9E9E9
| 256375 ||  || — || December 24, 2006 || Kanab || E. E. Sheridan || — || align=right | 2.9 km || 
|-id=376 bgcolor=#E9E9E9
| 256376 ||  || — || December 21, 2006 || Anderson Mesa || LONEOS || — || align=right | 3.2 km || 
|-id=377 bgcolor=#E9E9E9
| 256377 ||  || — || December 21, 2006 || Mount Lemmon || Mount Lemmon Survey || HOF || align=right | 3.0 km || 
|-id=378 bgcolor=#E9E9E9
| 256378 ||  || — || December 22, 2006 || Socorro || LINEAR || — || align=right | 3.0 km || 
|-id=379 bgcolor=#d6d6d6
| 256379 ||  || — || December 23, 2006 || Mount Lemmon || Mount Lemmon Survey || — || align=right | 3.1 km || 
|-id=380 bgcolor=#E9E9E9
| 256380 ||  || — || December 21, 2006 || Kitt Peak || Spacewatch || — || align=right | 3.1 km || 
|-id=381 bgcolor=#d6d6d6
| 256381 ||  || — || December 21, 2006 || Kitt Peak || Spacewatch || KOR || align=right | 1.6 km || 
|-id=382 bgcolor=#d6d6d6
| 256382 ||  || — || December 21, 2006 || Kitt Peak || Spacewatch || HYG || align=right | 3.9 km || 
|-id=383 bgcolor=#E9E9E9
| 256383 ||  || — || December 21, 2006 || Kitt Peak || Spacewatch || WIT || align=right | 1.4 km || 
|-id=384 bgcolor=#E9E9E9
| 256384 ||  || — || December 21, 2006 || Kitt Peak || Spacewatch || — || align=right | 2.0 km || 
|-id=385 bgcolor=#d6d6d6
| 256385 ||  || — || December 21, 2006 || Kitt Peak || Spacewatch || — || align=right | 4.2 km || 
|-id=386 bgcolor=#d6d6d6
| 256386 ||  || — || December 21, 2006 || Kitt Peak || Spacewatch || — || align=right | 2.8 km || 
|-id=387 bgcolor=#E9E9E9
| 256387 ||  || — || December 22, 2006 || Kitt Peak || Spacewatch || — || align=right | 2.8 km || 
|-id=388 bgcolor=#E9E9E9
| 256388 ||  || — || December 22, 2006 || Kitt Peak || Spacewatch || HOF || align=right | 4.2 km || 
|-id=389 bgcolor=#E9E9E9
| 256389 ||  || — || December 25, 2006 || Anderson Mesa || LONEOS || — || align=right | 2.3 km || 
|-id=390 bgcolor=#d6d6d6
| 256390 ||  || — || December 26, 2006 || Eskridge || Farpoint Obs. || — || align=right | 3.9 km || 
|-id=391 bgcolor=#E9E9E9
| 256391 ||  || — || December 28, 2006 || Marly || P. Kocher || AGN || align=right | 2.0 km || 
|-id=392 bgcolor=#E9E9E9
| 256392 ||  || — || December 21, 2006 || Kitt Peak || M. W. Buie || — || align=right | 4.9 km || 
|-id=393 bgcolor=#E9E9E9
| 256393 ||  || — || December 24, 2006 || Kitt Peak || Spacewatch || — || align=right | 2.8 km || 
|-id=394 bgcolor=#d6d6d6
| 256394 ||  || — || December 27, 2006 || Mount Lemmon || Mount Lemmon Survey || KOR || align=right | 1.7 km || 
|-id=395 bgcolor=#E9E9E9
| 256395 ||  || — || December 21, 2006 || Kitt Peak || Spacewatch || — || align=right | 2.4 km || 
|-id=396 bgcolor=#E9E9E9
| 256396 ||  || — || January 9, 2007 || Mayhill || A. Lowe || HNS || align=right | 1.8 km || 
|-id=397 bgcolor=#d6d6d6
| 256397 ||  || — || January 8, 2007 || Mount Lemmon || Mount Lemmon Survey || — || align=right | 2.5 km || 
|-id=398 bgcolor=#E9E9E9
| 256398 ||  || — || January 9, 2007 || Palomar || NEAT || — || align=right | 4.2 km || 
|-id=399 bgcolor=#E9E9E9
| 256399 ||  || — || January 9, 2007 || Palomar || NEAT || — || align=right | 2.3 km || 
|-id=400 bgcolor=#E9E9E9
| 256400 ||  || — || January 10, 2007 || Mount Lemmon || Mount Lemmon Survey || — || align=right | 3.3 km || 
|}

256401–256500 

|-bgcolor=#E9E9E9
| 256401 ||  || — || January 15, 2007 || Catalina || CSS || — || align=right | 3.7 km || 
|-id=402 bgcolor=#d6d6d6
| 256402 ||  || — || January 10, 2007 || Mount Lemmon || Mount Lemmon Survey || — || align=right | 2.4 km || 
|-id=403 bgcolor=#E9E9E9
| 256403 ||  || — || January 10, 2007 || Mount Lemmon || Mount Lemmon Survey || — || align=right | 1.9 km || 
|-id=404 bgcolor=#E9E9E9
| 256404 ||  || — || January 14, 2007 || Nyukasa || Mount Nyukasa Stn. || — || align=right | 2.9 km || 
|-id=405 bgcolor=#E9E9E9
| 256405 ||  || — || January 9, 2007 || Catalina || CSS || — || align=right | 2.0 km || 
|-id=406 bgcolor=#E9E9E9
| 256406 ||  || — || January 10, 2007 || Catalina || CSS || EUN || align=right | 1.8 km || 
|-id=407 bgcolor=#E9E9E9
| 256407 ||  || — || January 10, 2007 || Socorro || LINEAR || — || align=right | 1.5 km || 
|-id=408 bgcolor=#E9E9E9
| 256408 ||  || — || January 10, 2007 || Catalina || CSS || — || align=right | 2.4 km || 
|-id=409 bgcolor=#E9E9E9
| 256409 ||  || — || January 10, 2007 || Catalina || CSS || — || align=right | 3.9 km || 
|-id=410 bgcolor=#E9E9E9
| 256410 ||  || — || January 15, 2007 || Anderson Mesa || LONEOS || GEF || align=right | 2.0 km || 
|-id=411 bgcolor=#d6d6d6
| 256411 ||  || — || January 10, 2007 || Mount Lemmon || Mount Lemmon Survey || — || align=right | 2.7 km || 
|-id=412 bgcolor=#FFC2E0
| 256412 ||  || — || January 17, 2007 || Catalina || CSS || AMO +1km || align=right | 3.7 km || 
|-id=413 bgcolor=#d6d6d6
| 256413 ||  || — || January 17, 2007 || Palomar || NEAT || — || align=right | 3.4 km || 
|-id=414 bgcolor=#E9E9E9
| 256414 ||  || — || January 17, 2007 || Catalina || CSS || — || align=right | 2.0 km || 
|-id=415 bgcolor=#d6d6d6
| 256415 ||  || — || January 17, 2007 || Kitt Peak || Spacewatch || — || align=right | 4.7 km || 
|-id=416 bgcolor=#E9E9E9
| 256416 ||  || — || January 17, 2007 || Kitt Peak || Spacewatch || — || align=right | 2.6 km || 
|-id=417 bgcolor=#d6d6d6
| 256417 ||  || — || January 17, 2007 || Kitt Peak || Spacewatch || KOR || align=right | 1.5 km || 
|-id=418 bgcolor=#d6d6d6
| 256418 ||  || — || January 17, 2007 || Kitt Peak || Spacewatch || — || align=right | 2.5 km || 
|-id=419 bgcolor=#d6d6d6
| 256419 ||  || — || January 24, 2007 || Socorro || LINEAR || — || align=right | 4.0 km || 
|-id=420 bgcolor=#d6d6d6
| 256420 ||  || — || January 24, 2007 || Socorro || LINEAR || — || align=right | 2.8 km || 
|-id=421 bgcolor=#d6d6d6
| 256421 ||  || — || January 24, 2007 || Mount Lemmon || Mount Lemmon Survey || KOR || align=right | 1.4 km || 
|-id=422 bgcolor=#d6d6d6
| 256422 ||  || — || January 24, 2007 || Mount Lemmon || Mount Lemmon Survey || KOR || align=right | 2.0 km || 
|-id=423 bgcolor=#d6d6d6
| 256423 ||  || — || January 24, 2007 || Catalina || CSS || — || align=right | 5.3 km || 
|-id=424 bgcolor=#E9E9E9
| 256424 ||  || — || January 25, 2007 || Catalina || CSS || — || align=right | 1.5 km || 
|-id=425 bgcolor=#d6d6d6
| 256425 ||  || — || January 26, 2007 || Kitt Peak || Spacewatch || — || align=right | 3.3 km || 
|-id=426 bgcolor=#E9E9E9
| 256426 ||  || — || January 25, 2007 || Catalina || CSS || — || align=right | 3.3 km || 
|-id=427 bgcolor=#d6d6d6
| 256427 ||  || — || January 24, 2007 || Kitt Peak || Spacewatch || THM || align=right | 3.2 km || 
|-id=428 bgcolor=#d6d6d6
| 256428 ||  || — || January 24, 2007 || Socorro || LINEAR || — || align=right | 4.8 km || 
|-id=429 bgcolor=#E9E9E9
| 256429 ||  || — || January 27, 2007 || Mount Lemmon || Mount Lemmon Survey || HOF || align=right | 3.1 km || 
|-id=430 bgcolor=#d6d6d6
| 256430 ||  || — || January 27, 2007 || Mount Lemmon || Mount Lemmon Survey || — || align=right | 2.6 km || 
|-id=431 bgcolor=#E9E9E9
| 256431 ||  || — || January 29, 2007 || Cordell-Lorenz || Cordell–Lorenz Obs. || — || align=right | 3.0 km || 
|-id=432 bgcolor=#d6d6d6
| 256432 ||  || — || January 17, 2007 || Kitt Peak || Spacewatch || — || align=right | 3.0 km || 
|-id=433 bgcolor=#d6d6d6
| 256433 ||  || — || January 27, 2007 || Mount Lemmon || Mount Lemmon Survey || EOS || align=right | 3.2 km || 
|-id=434 bgcolor=#E9E9E9
| 256434 ||  || — || February 5, 2007 || Palomar || NEAT || — || align=right | 1.9 km || 
|-id=435 bgcolor=#E9E9E9
| 256435 ||  || — || February 7, 2007 || Mayhill || A. Lowe || — || align=right | 2.1 km || 
|-id=436 bgcolor=#d6d6d6
| 256436 ||  || — || February 6, 2007 || Mount Lemmon || Mount Lemmon Survey || — || align=right | 2.8 km || 
|-id=437 bgcolor=#d6d6d6
| 256437 ||  || — || February 6, 2007 || Kitt Peak || Spacewatch || — || align=right | 3.2 km || 
|-id=438 bgcolor=#d6d6d6
| 256438 ||  || — || February 7, 2007 || Mount Lemmon || Mount Lemmon Survey || KAR || align=right | 1.1 km || 
|-id=439 bgcolor=#E9E9E9
| 256439 ||  || — || February 5, 2007 || Palomar || NEAT || — || align=right | 2.3 km || 
|-id=440 bgcolor=#d6d6d6
| 256440 ||  || — || February 7, 2007 || Kitt Peak || Spacewatch || — || align=right | 2.3 km || 
|-id=441 bgcolor=#d6d6d6
| 256441 ||  || — || February 6, 2007 || Mount Lemmon || Mount Lemmon Survey || — || align=right | 2.8 km || 
|-id=442 bgcolor=#d6d6d6
| 256442 ||  || — || February 6, 2007 || Mount Lemmon || Mount Lemmon Survey || URS || align=right | 4.3 km || 
|-id=443 bgcolor=#d6d6d6
| 256443 ||  || — || February 6, 2007 || Kitt Peak || Spacewatch || KOR || align=right | 1.4 km || 
|-id=444 bgcolor=#d6d6d6
| 256444 ||  || — || February 6, 2007 || Mount Lemmon || Mount Lemmon Survey || KOR || align=right | 1.5 km || 
|-id=445 bgcolor=#d6d6d6
| 256445 ||  || — || February 6, 2007 || Mount Lemmon || Mount Lemmon Survey || — || align=right | 2.8 km || 
|-id=446 bgcolor=#d6d6d6
| 256446 ||  || — || February 7, 2007 || Kitt Peak || Spacewatch || EOS || align=right | 4.1 km || 
|-id=447 bgcolor=#d6d6d6
| 256447 ||  || — || February 7, 2007 || Kitt Peak || Spacewatch || — || align=right | 5.4 km || 
|-id=448 bgcolor=#d6d6d6
| 256448 ||  || — || February 7, 2007 || Kitt Peak || Spacewatch || EOS || align=right | 2.3 km || 
|-id=449 bgcolor=#d6d6d6
| 256449 ||  || — || February 7, 2007 || Mount Lemmon || Mount Lemmon Survey || — || align=right | 3.0 km || 
|-id=450 bgcolor=#d6d6d6
| 256450 ||  || — || February 8, 2007 || Palomar || NEAT || — || align=right | 4.8 km || 
|-id=451 bgcolor=#E9E9E9
| 256451 ||  || — || February 8, 2007 || Palomar || NEAT || — || align=right | 1.4 km || 
|-id=452 bgcolor=#d6d6d6
| 256452 ||  || — || February 9, 2007 || Altschwendt || W. Ries || CHA || align=right | 2.3 km || 
|-id=453 bgcolor=#d6d6d6
| 256453 ||  || — || February 10, 2007 || Mount Lemmon || Mount Lemmon Survey || CHA || align=right | 2.2 km || 
|-id=454 bgcolor=#E9E9E9
| 256454 ||  || — || February 15, 2007 || Catalina || CSS || DOR || align=right | 2.6 km || 
|-id=455 bgcolor=#d6d6d6
| 256455 ||  || — || February 15, 2007 || Palomar || NEAT || EOS || align=right | 2.9 km || 
|-id=456 bgcolor=#d6d6d6
| 256456 ||  || — || February 15, 2007 || Bergisch Gladbac || W. Bickel || — || align=right | 4.8 km || 
|-id=457 bgcolor=#d6d6d6
| 256457 ||  || — || February 9, 2007 || Catalina || CSS || — || align=right | 3.8 km || 
|-id=458 bgcolor=#d6d6d6
| 256458 ||  || — || February 10, 2007 || Catalina || CSS || EOS || align=right | 3.2 km || 
|-id=459 bgcolor=#E9E9E9
| 256459 ||  || — || February 8, 2007 || Mount Lemmon || Mount Lemmon Survey || — || align=right | 3.3 km || 
|-id=460 bgcolor=#FA8072
| 256460 ||  || — || February 17, 2007 || Socorro || LINEAR || — || align=right | 2.5 km || 
|-id=461 bgcolor=#d6d6d6
| 256461 ||  || — || February 18, 2007 || Calvin-Rehoboth || Calvin–Rehoboth Obs. || EOS || align=right | 2.4 km || 
|-id=462 bgcolor=#d6d6d6
| 256462 ||  || — || February 16, 2007 || Palomar || NEAT || — || align=right | 4.2 km || 
|-id=463 bgcolor=#E9E9E9
| 256463 ||  || — || February 16, 2007 || Palomar || NEAT || EUN || align=right | 1.8 km || 
|-id=464 bgcolor=#E9E9E9
| 256464 ||  || — || February 17, 2007 || Kitt Peak || Spacewatch || AGN || align=right | 1.4 km || 
|-id=465 bgcolor=#d6d6d6
| 256465 ||  || — || February 17, 2007 || Kitt Peak || Spacewatch || EOS || align=right | 2.7 km || 
|-id=466 bgcolor=#d6d6d6
| 256466 ||  || — || February 17, 2007 || Kitt Peak || Spacewatch || HYG || align=right | 3.0 km || 
|-id=467 bgcolor=#d6d6d6
| 256467 ||  || — || February 17, 2007 || Kitt Peak || Spacewatch || — || align=right | 4.3 km || 
|-id=468 bgcolor=#d6d6d6
| 256468 ||  || — || February 17, 2007 || Kitt Peak || Spacewatch || THM || align=right | 2.5 km || 
|-id=469 bgcolor=#d6d6d6
| 256469 ||  || — || February 17, 2007 || Kitt Peak || Spacewatch || CRO || align=right | 4.6 km || 
|-id=470 bgcolor=#d6d6d6
| 256470 ||  || — || February 17, 2007 || Kitt Peak || Spacewatch || — || align=right | 3.9 km || 
|-id=471 bgcolor=#d6d6d6
| 256471 ||  || — || February 17, 2007 || Kitt Peak || Spacewatch || — || align=right | 3.2 km || 
|-id=472 bgcolor=#d6d6d6
| 256472 ||  || — || February 21, 2007 || Kitt Peak || Spacewatch || SAN || align=right | 1.9 km || 
|-id=473 bgcolor=#d6d6d6
| 256473 ||  || — || February 18, 2007 || Antares || ARO || — || align=right | 3.1 km || 
|-id=474 bgcolor=#d6d6d6
| 256474 ||  || — || February 21, 2007 || Socorro || LINEAR || — || align=right | 4.5 km || 
|-id=475 bgcolor=#d6d6d6
| 256475 ||  || — || February 21, 2007 || Mount Lemmon || Mount Lemmon Survey || EOS || align=right | 2.2 km || 
|-id=476 bgcolor=#d6d6d6
| 256476 ||  || — || February 25, 2007 || Desert Moon || B. L. Stevens || — || align=right | 3.5 km || 
|-id=477 bgcolor=#d6d6d6
| 256477 ||  || — || February 21, 2007 || Kitt Peak || Spacewatch || — || align=right | 3.9 km || 
|-id=478 bgcolor=#d6d6d6
| 256478 ||  || — || February 23, 2007 || Kitt Peak || Spacewatch || EOS || align=right | 2.8 km || 
|-id=479 bgcolor=#d6d6d6
| 256479 ||  || — || February 23, 2007 || Kitt Peak || Spacewatch || — || align=right | 3.5 km || 
|-id=480 bgcolor=#d6d6d6
| 256480 ||  || — || February 23, 2007 || Kitt Peak || Spacewatch || — || align=right | 5.8 km || 
|-id=481 bgcolor=#E9E9E9
| 256481 ||  || — || February 27, 2007 || Eskridge || G. Hug || JUN || align=right | 2.1 km || 
|-id=482 bgcolor=#d6d6d6
| 256482 ||  || — || February 24, 2007 || Nyukasa || Mount Nyukasa Stn. || HYG || align=right | 3.3 km || 
|-id=483 bgcolor=#d6d6d6
| 256483 ||  || — || February 17, 2007 || Mount Lemmon || Mount Lemmon Survey || — || align=right | 5.0 km || 
|-id=484 bgcolor=#d6d6d6
| 256484 ||  || — || February 17, 2007 || Kitt Peak || Spacewatch || — || align=right | 2.9 km || 
|-id=485 bgcolor=#d6d6d6
| 256485 ||  || — || February 25, 2007 || Kitt Peak || Spacewatch || — || align=right | 2.9 km || 
|-id=486 bgcolor=#d6d6d6
| 256486 ||  || — || March 9, 2007 || Mount Lemmon || Mount Lemmon Survey || — || align=right | 3.8 km || 
|-id=487 bgcolor=#d6d6d6
| 256487 ||  || — || March 9, 2007 || Palomar || NEAT || — || align=right | 3.8 km || 
|-id=488 bgcolor=#d6d6d6
| 256488 ||  || — || March 9, 2007 || Mount Lemmon || Mount Lemmon Survey || — || align=right | 3.1 km || 
|-id=489 bgcolor=#d6d6d6
| 256489 ||  || — || March 9, 2007 || Palomar || NEAT || EOS || align=right | 2.8 km || 
|-id=490 bgcolor=#d6d6d6
| 256490 ||  || — || March 9, 2007 || Mount Lemmon || Mount Lemmon Survey || — || align=right | 3.3 km || 
|-id=491 bgcolor=#d6d6d6
| 256491 ||  || — || March 9, 2007 || Mount Lemmon || Mount Lemmon Survey || — || align=right | 5.1 km || 
|-id=492 bgcolor=#d6d6d6
| 256492 ||  || — || March 9, 2007 || Kitt Peak || Spacewatch || — || align=right | 3.4 km || 
|-id=493 bgcolor=#d6d6d6
| 256493 ||  || — || March 9, 2007 || Mount Lemmon || Mount Lemmon Survey || — || align=right | 2.3 km || 
|-id=494 bgcolor=#d6d6d6
| 256494 ||  || — || March 9, 2007 || Mount Lemmon || Mount Lemmon Survey || — || align=right | 3.4 km || 
|-id=495 bgcolor=#E9E9E9
| 256495 ||  || — || March 11, 2007 || Mount Lemmon || Mount Lemmon Survey || MAR || align=right | 1.7 km || 
|-id=496 bgcolor=#d6d6d6
| 256496 ||  || — || March 10, 2007 || Eskridge || G. Hug || — || align=right | 4.4 km || 
|-id=497 bgcolor=#d6d6d6
| 256497 ||  || — || March 9, 2007 || Catalina || CSS || THM || align=right | 3.3 km || 
|-id=498 bgcolor=#d6d6d6
| 256498 ||  || — || March 9, 2007 || Mount Lemmon || Mount Lemmon Survey || — || align=right | 2.6 km || 
|-id=499 bgcolor=#d6d6d6
| 256499 ||  || — || March 10, 2007 || Kitt Peak || Spacewatch || — || align=right | 2.8 km || 
|-id=500 bgcolor=#d6d6d6
| 256500 ||  || — || March 10, 2007 || Palomar || NEAT || THM || align=right | 3.5 km || 
|}

256501–256600 

|-bgcolor=#d6d6d6
| 256501 ||  || — || March 12, 2007 || Kitt Peak || Spacewatch || — || align=right | 3.3 km || 
|-id=502 bgcolor=#d6d6d6
| 256502 ||  || — || March 9, 2007 || Kitt Peak || Spacewatch || — || align=right | 3.3 km || 
|-id=503 bgcolor=#d6d6d6
| 256503 ||  || — || March 9, 2007 || Mount Lemmon || Mount Lemmon Survey || — || align=right | 3.6 km || 
|-id=504 bgcolor=#d6d6d6
| 256504 ||  || — || March 10, 2007 || Kitt Peak || Spacewatch || — || align=right | 2.8 km || 
|-id=505 bgcolor=#C2FFFF
| 256505 ||  || — || March 11, 2007 || Kitt Peak || Spacewatch || L5 || align=right | 12 km || 
|-id=506 bgcolor=#d6d6d6
| 256506 ||  || — || March 11, 2007 || Kitt Peak || Spacewatch || — || align=right | 3.5 km || 
|-id=507 bgcolor=#d6d6d6
| 256507 ||  || — || March 11, 2007 || Mount Lemmon || Mount Lemmon Survey || HYG || align=right | 3.6 km || 
|-id=508 bgcolor=#d6d6d6
| 256508 ||  || — || March 11, 2007 || Kitt Peak || Spacewatch || — || align=right | 3.8 km || 
|-id=509 bgcolor=#E9E9E9
| 256509 ||  || — || March 14, 2007 || Mount Lemmon || Mount Lemmon Survey || HOF || align=right | 3.5 km || 
|-id=510 bgcolor=#d6d6d6
| 256510 ||  || — || March 11, 2007 || Kitt Peak || Spacewatch || — || align=right | 4.6 km || 
|-id=511 bgcolor=#d6d6d6
| 256511 ||  || — || March 9, 2007 || Mount Lemmon || Mount Lemmon Survey || THM || align=right | 3.4 km || 
|-id=512 bgcolor=#d6d6d6
| 256512 ||  || — || March 11, 2007 || Kitt Peak || Spacewatch || — || align=right | 2.7 km || 
|-id=513 bgcolor=#d6d6d6
| 256513 ||  || — || March 12, 2007 || Kitt Peak || Spacewatch || — || align=right | 5.0 km || 
|-id=514 bgcolor=#d6d6d6
| 256514 ||  || — || March 12, 2007 || Kitt Peak || Spacewatch || — || align=right | 4.2 km || 
|-id=515 bgcolor=#d6d6d6
| 256515 ||  || — || March 13, 2007 || Črni Vrh || Črni Vrh || MEL || align=right | 4.8 km || 
|-id=516 bgcolor=#d6d6d6
| 256516 ||  || — || March 11, 2007 || Kitt Peak || Spacewatch || — || align=right | 3.8 km || 
|-id=517 bgcolor=#d6d6d6
| 256517 ||  || — || March 14, 2007 || Kitt Peak || Spacewatch || HYG || align=right | 3.8 km || 
|-id=518 bgcolor=#d6d6d6
| 256518 ||  || — || March 14, 2007 || Kitt Peak || Spacewatch || — || align=right | 4.6 km || 
|-id=519 bgcolor=#d6d6d6
| 256519 ||  || — || March 13, 2007 || Mount Lemmon || Mount Lemmon Survey || HYG || align=right | 3.5 km || 
|-id=520 bgcolor=#d6d6d6
| 256520 ||  || — || March 14, 2007 || Anderson Mesa || LONEOS || 7:4 || align=right | 6.2 km || 
|-id=521 bgcolor=#d6d6d6
| 256521 ||  || — || March 11, 2007 || Kitt Peak || Spacewatch || — || align=right | 3.5 km || 
|-id=522 bgcolor=#d6d6d6
| 256522 ||  || — || March 14, 2007 || Catalina || CSS || — || align=right | 6.2 km || 
|-id=523 bgcolor=#d6d6d6
| 256523 ||  || — || March 8, 2007 || Palomar || NEAT || — || align=right | 4.1 km || 
|-id=524 bgcolor=#d6d6d6
| 256524 ||  || — || March 11, 2007 || Siding Spring || SSS || — || align=right | 6.2 km || 
|-id=525 bgcolor=#d6d6d6
| 256525 ||  || — || March 11, 2007 || Mount Lemmon || Mount Lemmon Survey || EOS || align=right | 2.4 km || 
|-id=526 bgcolor=#d6d6d6
| 256526 ||  || — || March 13, 2007 || Mount Lemmon || Mount Lemmon Survey || — || align=right | 4.2 km || 
|-id=527 bgcolor=#d6d6d6
| 256527 ||  || — || March 14, 2007 || Mount Lemmon || Mount Lemmon Survey || — || align=right | 3.4 km || 
|-id=528 bgcolor=#d6d6d6
| 256528 ||  || — || March 12, 2007 || Mount Lemmon || Mount Lemmon Survey || — || align=right | 4.8 km || 
|-id=529 bgcolor=#d6d6d6
| 256529 ||  || — || March 16, 2007 || Mount Lemmon || Mount Lemmon Survey || 7:4 || align=right | 4.2 km || 
|-id=530 bgcolor=#d6d6d6
| 256530 ||  || — || March 20, 2007 || Kitt Peak || Spacewatch || — || align=right | 4.2 km || 
|-id=531 bgcolor=#d6d6d6
| 256531 ||  || — || March 20, 2007 || Kitt Peak || Spacewatch || EUP || align=right | 5.5 km || 
|-id=532 bgcolor=#d6d6d6
| 256532 ||  || — || March 20, 2007 || Kitt Peak || Spacewatch || THM || align=right | 2.2 km || 
|-id=533 bgcolor=#d6d6d6
| 256533 ||  || — || March 20, 2007 || Kitt Peak || Spacewatch || THM || align=right | 2.9 km || 
|-id=534 bgcolor=#d6d6d6
| 256534 ||  || — || March 26, 2007 || Kitt Peak || Spacewatch || — || align=right | 3.7 km || 
|-id=535 bgcolor=#d6d6d6
| 256535 ||  || — || March 16, 2007 || Mount Lemmon || Mount Lemmon Survey || — || align=right | 3.2 km || 
|-id=536 bgcolor=#d6d6d6
| 256536 ||  || — || April 11, 2007 || Lulin Observatory || LUSS || — || align=right | 6.0 km || 
|-id=537 bgcolor=#d6d6d6
| 256537 Zahn ||  ||  || April 10, 2007 || Saint-Sulpice || B. Christophe || — || align=right | 4.0 km || 
|-id=538 bgcolor=#d6d6d6
| 256538 ||  || — || April 11, 2007 || Kitt Peak || Spacewatch || — || align=right | 4.6 km || 
|-id=539 bgcolor=#d6d6d6
| 256539 ||  || — || April 11, 2007 || Kitt Peak || Spacewatch || — || align=right | 4.2 km || 
|-id=540 bgcolor=#d6d6d6
| 256540 ||  || — || April 11, 2007 || Mount Lemmon || Mount Lemmon Survey || — || align=right | 3.8 km || 
|-id=541 bgcolor=#d6d6d6
| 256541 ||  || — || April 14, 2007 || Catalina || CSS || — || align=right | 6.0 km || 
|-id=542 bgcolor=#d6d6d6
| 256542 ||  || — || April 15, 2007 || Kitt Peak || Spacewatch || 3:2 || align=right | 6.5 km || 
|-id=543 bgcolor=#d6d6d6
| 256543 ||  || — || April 15, 2007 || Kitt Peak || Spacewatch || — || align=right | 4.1 km || 
|-id=544 bgcolor=#d6d6d6
| 256544 ||  || — || April 7, 2007 || Mauna Kea || Mauna Kea Obs. || — || align=right | 4.6 km || 
|-id=545 bgcolor=#d6d6d6
| 256545 ||  || — || April 11, 2007 || Siding Spring || SSS || TIR || align=right | 5.4 km || 
|-id=546 bgcolor=#d6d6d6
| 256546 ||  || — || April 17, 2007 || Antares || ARO || 628 || align=right | 2.6 km || 
|-id=547 bgcolor=#d6d6d6
| 256547 Davidesmith ||  ||  || April 22, 2007 || CBA-NOVAC || D. R. Skillman || — || align=right | 4.6 km || 
|-id=548 bgcolor=#d6d6d6
| 256548 ||  || — || April 19, 2007 || Kitt Peak || Spacewatch || TIR || align=right | 5.3 km || 
|-id=549 bgcolor=#d6d6d6
| 256549 ||  || — || April 25, 2007 || Kitt Peak || Spacewatch || — || align=right | 5.4 km || 
|-id=550 bgcolor=#C2FFFF
| 256550 ||  || — || June 11, 2007 || Mauna Kea || D. D. Balam || L4 || align=right | 12 km || 
|-id=551 bgcolor=#fefefe
| 256551 ||  || — || July 21, 2007 || Tiki || S. F. Hönig, N. Teamo || H || align=right data-sort-value="0.75" | 750 m || 
|-id=552 bgcolor=#fefefe
| 256552 ||  || — || July 22, 2007 || Lulin || LUSS || V || align=right data-sort-value="0.76" | 760 m || 
|-id=553 bgcolor=#C2FFFF
| 256553 ||  || — || August 8, 2007 || Charleston || ARO || L4ERY || align=right | 11 km || 
|-id=554 bgcolor=#fefefe
| 256554 ||  || — || September 10, 2007 || Mount Lemmon || Mount Lemmon Survey || — || align=right | 1.0 km || 
|-id=555 bgcolor=#E9E9E9
| 256555 ||  || — || September 14, 2007 || Mount Lemmon || Mount Lemmon Survey || — || align=right | 1.4 km || 
|-id=556 bgcolor=#C2FFFF
| 256556 ||  || — || September 14, 2007 || Kitt Peak || Spacewatch || L4 || align=right | 10 km || 
|-id=557 bgcolor=#d6d6d6
| 256557 ||  || — || September 14, 2007 || Catalina || CSS || EOS || align=right | 2.8 km || 
|-id=558 bgcolor=#d6d6d6
| 256558 ||  || — || September 11, 2007 || Kitt Peak || Spacewatch || — || align=right | 3.9 km || 
|-id=559 bgcolor=#fefefe
| 256559 ||  || — || September 15, 2007 || Mount Lemmon || Mount Lemmon Survey || FLO || align=right data-sort-value="0.82" | 820 m || 
|-id=560 bgcolor=#fefefe
| 256560 ||  || — || September 15, 2007 || Mount Lemmon || Mount Lemmon Survey || — || align=right | 1.2 km || 
|-id=561 bgcolor=#d6d6d6
| 256561 ||  || — || September 13, 2007 || Catalina || CSS || — || align=right | 5.6 km || 
|-id=562 bgcolor=#fefefe
| 256562 ||  || — || September 2, 2007 || Catalina || CSS || V || align=right | 1.2 km || 
|-id=563 bgcolor=#fefefe
| 256563 ||  || — || September 15, 2007 || Mount Lemmon || Mount Lemmon Survey || V || align=right data-sort-value="0.85" | 850 m || 
|-id=564 bgcolor=#fefefe
| 256564 ||  || — || September 10, 2007 || Mount Lemmon || Mount Lemmon Survey || V || align=right data-sort-value="0.78" | 780 m || 
|-id=565 bgcolor=#fefefe
| 256565 ||  || — || September 14, 2007 || Mount Lemmon || Mount Lemmon Survey || — || align=right data-sort-value="0.81" | 810 m || 
|-id=566 bgcolor=#fefefe
| 256566 ||  || — || September 20, 2007 || Catalina || CSS || — || align=right | 2.4 km || 
|-id=567 bgcolor=#fefefe
| 256567 ||  || — || October 4, 2007 || Kitt Peak || Spacewatch || — || align=right data-sort-value="0.83" | 830 m || 
|-id=568 bgcolor=#fefefe
| 256568 ||  || — || October 7, 2007 || Mayhill || A. Lowe || NYS || align=right data-sort-value="0.97" | 970 m || 
|-id=569 bgcolor=#fefefe
| 256569 ||  || — || October 6, 2007 || Bergisch Gladbac || W. Bickel || V || align=right data-sort-value="0.78" | 780 m || 
|-id=570 bgcolor=#fefefe
| 256570 ||  || — || October 7, 2007 || Črni Vrh || Črni Vrh || — || align=right | 1.0 km || 
|-id=571 bgcolor=#fefefe
| 256571 ||  || — || October 6, 2007 || Kitt Peak || Spacewatch || — || align=right data-sort-value="0.94" | 940 m || 
|-id=572 bgcolor=#fefefe
| 256572 ||  || — || October 6, 2007 || Kitami || K. Endate || — || align=right | 1.4 km || 
|-id=573 bgcolor=#fefefe
| 256573 ||  || — || October 10, 2007 || Altschwendt || W. Ries || — || align=right data-sort-value="0.87" | 870 m || 
|-id=574 bgcolor=#fefefe
| 256574 ||  || — || October 6, 2007 || Purple Mountain || PMO NEO || FLO || align=right data-sort-value="0.72" | 720 m || 
|-id=575 bgcolor=#fefefe
| 256575 ||  || — || October 6, 2007 || Kitt Peak || Spacewatch || — || align=right | 1.0 km || 
|-id=576 bgcolor=#fefefe
| 256576 ||  || — || October 9, 2007 || Socorro || LINEAR || — || align=right | 1.00 km || 
|-id=577 bgcolor=#fefefe
| 256577 ||  || — || October 13, 2007 || Socorro || LINEAR || — || align=right data-sort-value="0.98" | 980 m || 
|-id=578 bgcolor=#fefefe
| 256578 ||  || — || October 9, 2007 || Purple Mountain || PMO NEO || — || align=right | 1.1 km || 
|-id=579 bgcolor=#fefefe
| 256579 ||  || — || October 8, 2007 || Kitt Peak || Spacewatch || NYS || align=right data-sort-value="0.88" | 880 m || 
|-id=580 bgcolor=#fefefe
| 256580 ||  || — || October 8, 2007 || Kitt Peak || Spacewatch || — || align=right data-sort-value="0.97" | 970 m || 
|-id=581 bgcolor=#fefefe
| 256581 ||  || — || October 8, 2007 || Kitt Peak || Spacewatch || — || align=right data-sort-value="0.85" | 850 m || 
|-id=582 bgcolor=#d6d6d6
| 256582 ||  || — || October 9, 2007 || Mount Lemmon || Mount Lemmon Survey || — || align=right | 3.3 km || 
|-id=583 bgcolor=#fefefe
| 256583 ||  || — || October 10, 2007 || Kitt Peak || Spacewatch || FLO || align=right data-sort-value="0.78" | 780 m || 
|-id=584 bgcolor=#fefefe
| 256584 ||  || — || October 11, 2007 || Kitt Peak || Spacewatch || — || align=right | 1.2 km || 
|-id=585 bgcolor=#fefefe
| 256585 ||  || — || October 14, 2007 || Kitt Peak || Spacewatch || — || align=right | 1.2 km || 
|-id=586 bgcolor=#fefefe
| 256586 ||  || — || October 15, 2007 || Catalina || CSS || — || align=right data-sort-value="0.83" | 830 m || 
|-id=587 bgcolor=#fefefe
| 256587 ||  || — || October 15, 2007 || Mount Lemmon || Mount Lemmon Survey || — || align=right data-sort-value="0.86" | 860 m || 
|-id=588 bgcolor=#fefefe
| 256588 ||  || — || October 15, 2007 || Kitt Peak || Spacewatch || FLO || align=right data-sort-value="0.75" | 750 m || 
|-id=589 bgcolor=#E9E9E9
| 256589 ||  || — || October 12, 2007 || Kitt Peak || Spacewatch || — || align=right | 4.7 km || 
|-id=590 bgcolor=#fefefe
| 256590 ||  || — || October 4, 2007 || Kitt Peak || Spacewatch || NYS || align=right data-sort-value="0.85" | 850 m || 
|-id=591 bgcolor=#fefefe
| 256591 ||  || — || October 14, 2007 || Mount Lemmon || Mount Lemmon Survey || NYS || align=right data-sort-value="0.90" | 900 m || 
|-id=592 bgcolor=#fefefe
| 256592 ||  || — || October 18, 2007 || Kitt Peak || Spacewatch || — || align=right data-sort-value="0.90" | 900 m || 
|-id=593 bgcolor=#fefefe
| 256593 ||  || — || October 19, 2007 || Kitt Peak || Spacewatch || V || align=right data-sort-value="0.71" | 710 m || 
|-id=594 bgcolor=#fefefe
| 256594 ||  || — || October 18, 2007 || Mount Lemmon || Mount Lemmon Survey || FLO || align=right data-sort-value="0.78" | 780 m || 
|-id=595 bgcolor=#fefefe
| 256595 ||  || — || October 30, 2007 || Kitt Peak || Spacewatch || — || align=right data-sort-value="0.81" | 810 m || 
|-id=596 bgcolor=#fefefe
| 256596 ||  || — || October 30, 2007 || Kitt Peak || Spacewatch || — || align=right | 1.2 km || 
|-id=597 bgcolor=#E9E9E9
| 256597 ||  || — || October 30, 2007 || Kitt Peak || Spacewatch || MIS || align=right | 2.7 km || 
|-id=598 bgcolor=#d6d6d6
| 256598 ||  || — || October 30, 2007 || Mount Lemmon || Mount Lemmon Survey || — || align=right | 3.6 km || 
|-id=599 bgcolor=#fefefe
| 256599 ||  || — || October 30, 2007 || Mount Lemmon || Mount Lemmon Survey || — || align=right data-sort-value="0.73" | 730 m || 
|-id=600 bgcolor=#fefefe
| 256600 ||  || — || October 30, 2007 || Kitt Peak || Spacewatch || — || align=right | 1.1 km || 
|}

256601–256700 

|-bgcolor=#fefefe
| 256601 ||  || — || October 30, 2007 || Kitt Peak || Spacewatch || — || align=right data-sort-value="0.77" | 770 m || 
|-id=602 bgcolor=#fefefe
| 256602 ||  || — || November 2, 2007 || Wrightwood || J. W. Young || FLO || align=right data-sort-value="0.89" | 890 m || 
|-id=603 bgcolor=#fefefe
| 256603 ||  || — || November 2, 2007 || Kitt Peak || Spacewatch || — || align=right | 1.2 km || 
|-id=604 bgcolor=#fefefe
| 256604 ||  || — || November 3, 2007 || Kitt Peak || Spacewatch || — || align=right data-sort-value="0.78" | 780 m || 
|-id=605 bgcolor=#fefefe
| 256605 ||  || — || November 1, 2007 || Kitt Peak || Spacewatch || FLO || align=right data-sort-value="0.72" | 720 m || 
|-id=606 bgcolor=#fefefe
| 256606 ||  || — || November 1, 2007 || Kitt Peak || Spacewatch || — || align=right | 1.5 km || 
|-id=607 bgcolor=#fefefe
| 256607 ||  || — || November 1, 2007 || Kitt Peak || Spacewatch || FLO || align=right data-sort-value="0.99" | 990 m || 
|-id=608 bgcolor=#fefefe
| 256608 ||  || — || November 2, 2007 || Kitt Peak || Spacewatch || FLO || align=right data-sort-value="0.64" | 640 m || 
|-id=609 bgcolor=#fefefe
| 256609 ||  || — || November 2, 2007 || Socorro || LINEAR || FLO || align=right data-sort-value="0.66" | 660 m || 
|-id=610 bgcolor=#fefefe
| 256610 ||  || — || November 2, 2007 || Socorro || LINEAR || — || align=right data-sort-value="0.82" | 820 m || 
|-id=611 bgcolor=#fefefe
| 256611 ||  || — || November 4, 2007 || Socorro || LINEAR || — || align=right data-sort-value="0.74" | 740 m || 
|-id=612 bgcolor=#fefefe
| 256612 ||  || — || November 1, 2007 || Kitt Peak || Spacewatch || FLO || align=right data-sort-value="0.65" | 650 m || 
|-id=613 bgcolor=#fefefe
| 256613 ||  || — || November 1, 2007 || Lulin || LUSS || FLO || align=right data-sort-value="0.73" | 730 m || 
|-id=614 bgcolor=#fefefe
| 256614 ||  || — || November 3, 2007 || Kitt Peak || Spacewatch || — || align=right data-sort-value="0.61" | 610 m || 
|-id=615 bgcolor=#fefefe
| 256615 ||  || — || November 3, 2007 || Kitt Peak || Spacewatch || FLO || align=right data-sort-value="0.69" | 690 m || 
|-id=616 bgcolor=#fefefe
| 256616 ||  || — || November 4, 2007 || Kitt Peak || Spacewatch || V || align=right data-sort-value="0.68" | 680 m || 
|-id=617 bgcolor=#fefefe
| 256617 ||  || — || November 5, 2007 || Kitt Peak || Spacewatch || — || align=right data-sort-value="0.99" | 990 m || 
|-id=618 bgcolor=#fefefe
| 256618 ||  || — || November 5, 2007 || Kitt Peak || Spacewatch || — || align=right data-sort-value="0.75" | 750 m || 
|-id=619 bgcolor=#fefefe
| 256619 ||  || — || November 5, 2007 || Kitt Peak || Spacewatch || — || align=right data-sort-value="0.73" | 730 m || 
|-id=620 bgcolor=#fefefe
| 256620 ||  || — || November 5, 2007 || Kitt Peak || Spacewatch || — || align=right | 1.0 km || 
|-id=621 bgcolor=#fefefe
| 256621 ||  || — || November 8, 2007 || Mount Lemmon || Mount Lemmon Survey || — || align=right data-sort-value="0.87" | 870 m || 
|-id=622 bgcolor=#fefefe
| 256622 ||  || — || November 4, 2007 || Mount Lemmon || Mount Lemmon Survey || — || align=right | 1.1 km || 
|-id=623 bgcolor=#fefefe
| 256623 ||  || — || November 4, 2007 || Mount Lemmon || Mount Lemmon Survey || — || align=right data-sort-value="0.73" | 730 m || 
|-id=624 bgcolor=#fefefe
| 256624 ||  || — || November 4, 2007 || Mount Lemmon || Mount Lemmon Survey || — || align=right | 1.7 km || 
|-id=625 bgcolor=#fefefe
| 256625 ||  || — || November 9, 2007 || Kitt Peak || Spacewatch || — || align=right | 1.6 km || 
|-id=626 bgcolor=#fefefe
| 256626 ||  || — || November 12, 2007 || Dauban || Chante-Perdrix Obs. || — || align=right data-sort-value="0.80" | 800 m || 
|-id=627 bgcolor=#fefefe
| 256627 ||  || — || November 12, 2007 || Mount Lemmon || Mount Lemmon Survey || — || align=right | 2.6 km || 
|-id=628 bgcolor=#fefefe
| 256628 ||  || — || November 7, 2007 || Kitt Peak || Spacewatch || — || align=right data-sort-value="0.80" | 800 m || 
|-id=629 bgcolor=#fefefe
| 256629 ||  || — || November 7, 2007 || Kitt Peak || Spacewatch || — || align=right data-sort-value="0.94" | 940 m || 
|-id=630 bgcolor=#fefefe
| 256630 ||  || — || November 9, 2007 || Kitt Peak || Spacewatch || — || align=right data-sort-value="0.79" | 790 m || 
|-id=631 bgcolor=#fefefe
| 256631 ||  || — || November 11, 2007 || Mount Lemmon || Mount Lemmon Survey || — || align=right data-sort-value="0.82" | 820 m || 
|-id=632 bgcolor=#fefefe
| 256632 ||  || — || November 11, 2007 || Mount Lemmon || Mount Lemmon Survey || MAS || align=right data-sort-value="0.95" | 950 m || 
|-id=633 bgcolor=#fefefe
| 256633 ||  || — || November 15, 2007 || Socorro || LINEAR || — || align=right data-sort-value="0.97" | 970 m || 
|-id=634 bgcolor=#fefefe
| 256634 ||  || — || November 15, 2007 || Socorro || LINEAR || FLO || align=right data-sort-value="0.94" | 940 m || 
|-id=635 bgcolor=#fefefe
| 256635 ||  || — || November 14, 2007 || Kitt Peak || Spacewatch || — || align=right | 1.0 km || 
|-id=636 bgcolor=#fefefe
| 256636 ||  || — || November 14, 2007 || Kitt Peak || Spacewatch || — || align=right | 1.2 km || 
|-id=637 bgcolor=#fefefe
| 256637 ||  || — || November 7, 2007 || Mount Lemmon || Mount Lemmon Survey || V || align=right | 1.0 km || 
|-id=638 bgcolor=#fefefe
| 256638 ||  || — || November 3, 2007 || Mount Lemmon || Mount Lemmon Survey || — || align=right data-sort-value="0.97" | 970 m || 
|-id=639 bgcolor=#fefefe
| 256639 ||  || — || November 2, 2007 || Mount Lemmon || Mount Lemmon Survey || — || align=right data-sort-value="0.97" | 970 m || 
|-id=640 bgcolor=#fefefe
| 256640 ||  || — || November 11, 2007 || Mount Lemmon || Mount Lemmon Survey || MAS || align=right data-sort-value="0.67" | 670 m || 
|-id=641 bgcolor=#fefefe
| 256641 ||  || — || November 3, 2007 || Mount Lemmon || Mount Lemmon Survey || — || align=right | 1.1 km || 
|-id=642 bgcolor=#fefefe
| 256642 ||  || — || November 5, 2007 || Mount Lemmon || Mount Lemmon Survey || — || align=right data-sort-value="0.95" | 950 m || 
|-id=643 bgcolor=#fefefe
| 256643 ||  || — || November 4, 2007 || Mount Lemmon || Mount Lemmon Survey || — || align=right data-sort-value="0.72" | 720 m || 
|-id=644 bgcolor=#fefefe
| 256644 ||  || — || November 8, 2007 || Kitt Peak || Spacewatch || — || align=right data-sort-value="0.96" | 960 m || 
|-id=645 bgcolor=#fefefe
| 256645 ||  || — || November 11, 2007 || Mount Lemmon || Mount Lemmon Survey || MAS || align=right data-sort-value="0.85" | 850 m || 
|-id=646 bgcolor=#fefefe
| 256646 ||  || — || November 18, 2007 || Bisei SG Center || BATTeRS || — || align=right | 2.5 km || 
|-id=647 bgcolor=#fefefe
| 256647 ||  || — || November 18, 2007 || Socorro || LINEAR || — || align=right data-sort-value="0.86" | 860 m || 
|-id=648 bgcolor=#d6d6d6
| 256648 ||  || — || November 18, 2007 || Mount Lemmon || Mount Lemmon Survey || EOS || align=right | 2.8 km || 
|-id=649 bgcolor=#fefefe
| 256649 ||  || — || November 19, 2007 || Mount Lemmon || Mount Lemmon Survey || FLO || align=right data-sort-value="0.88" | 880 m || 
|-id=650 bgcolor=#fefefe
| 256650 ||  || — || November 19, 2007 || Mount Lemmon || Mount Lemmon Survey || FLO || align=right data-sort-value="0.73" | 730 m || 
|-id=651 bgcolor=#fefefe
| 256651 ||  || — || November 19, 2007 || Mount Lemmon || Mount Lemmon Survey || MAS || align=right data-sort-value="0.88" | 880 m || 
|-id=652 bgcolor=#fefefe
| 256652 ||  || — || November 19, 2007 || Mount Lemmon || Mount Lemmon Survey || — || align=right | 1.1 km || 
|-id=653 bgcolor=#fefefe
| 256653 ||  || — || December 3, 2007 || Eskridge || G. Hug || — || align=right data-sort-value="0.83" | 830 m || 
|-id=654 bgcolor=#fefefe
| 256654 ||  || — || December 5, 2007 || Bisei SG Center || BATTeRS || FLO || align=right data-sort-value="0.89" | 890 m || 
|-id=655 bgcolor=#fefefe
| 256655 ||  || — || December 11, 2007 || Great Shefford || P. Birtwhistle || FLO || align=right data-sort-value="0.65" | 650 m || 
|-id=656 bgcolor=#fefefe
| 256656 ||  || — || December 6, 2007 || Socorro || LINEAR || FLO || align=right data-sort-value="0.94" | 940 m || 
|-id=657 bgcolor=#fefefe
| 256657 ||  || — || December 13, 2007 || Majorca || OAM Obs. || — || align=right | 1.2 km || 
|-id=658 bgcolor=#fefefe
| 256658 ||  || — || December 14, 2007 || Costitx || OAM Obs. || V || align=right data-sort-value="0.92" | 920 m || 
|-id=659 bgcolor=#fefefe
| 256659 ||  || — || December 10, 2007 || Socorro || LINEAR || — || align=right data-sort-value="0.83" | 830 m || 
|-id=660 bgcolor=#fefefe
| 256660 ||  || — || December 10, 2007 || Socorro || LINEAR || — || align=right | 1.1 km || 
|-id=661 bgcolor=#fefefe
| 256661 ||  || — || December 10, 2007 || Socorro || LINEAR || — || align=right data-sort-value="0.76" | 760 m || 
|-id=662 bgcolor=#fefefe
| 256662 ||  || — || December 14, 2007 || Kitt Peak || Spacewatch || — || align=right | 1.1 km || 
|-id=663 bgcolor=#fefefe
| 256663 ||  || — || December 14, 2007 || Mount Lemmon || Mount Lemmon Survey || — || align=right data-sort-value="0.99" | 990 m || 
|-id=664 bgcolor=#fefefe
| 256664 ||  || — || December 14, 2007 || Mount Lemmon || Mount Lemmon Survey || FLO || align=right data-sort-value="0.92" | 920 m || 
|-id=665 bgcolor=#fefefe
| 256665 ||  || — || December 15, 2007 || Kitt Peak || Spacewatch || — || align=right | 1.6 km || 
|-id=666 bgcolor=#fefefe
| 256666 ||  || — || December 15, 2007 || Mount Lemmon || Mount Lemmon Survey || — || align=right data-sort-value="0.80" | 800 m || 
|-id=667 bgcolor=#E9E9E9
| 256667 ||  || — || December 15, 2007 || Kitt Peak || Spacewatch || — || align=right | 3.2 km || 
|-id=668 bgcolor=#fefefe
| 256668 ||  || — || December 14, 2007 || Mount Lemmon || Mount Lemmon Survey || NYS || align=right data-sort-value="0.88" | 880 m || 
|-id=669 bgcolor=#fefefe
| 256669 ||  || — || December 14, 2007 || Mount Lemmon || Mount Lemmon Survey || — || align=right data-sort-value="0.81" | 810 m || 
|-id=670 bgcolor=#FFC2E0
| 256670 ||  || — || December 14, 2007 || Socorro || LINEAR || AMO +1km || align=right data-sort-value="0.85" | 850 m || 
|-id=671 bgcolor=#E9E9E9
| 256671 ||  || — || December 16, 2007 || Mount Lemmon || Mount Lemmon Survey || MAR || align=right | 1.5 km || 
|-id=672 bgcolor=#E9E9E9
| 256672 ||  || — || December 16, 2007 || Socorro || LINEAR || EUN || align=right | 1.9 km || 
|-id=673 bgcolor=#fefefe
| 256673 ||  || — || December 16, 2007 || Kitt Peak || Spacewatch || NYS || align=right data-sort-value="0.79" | 790 m || 
|-id=674 bgcolor=#fefefe
| 256674 ||  || — || December 16, 2007 || Kitt Peak || Spacewatch || FLO || align=right data-sort-value="0.67" | 670 m || 
|-id=675 bgcolor=#fefefe
| 256675 ||  || — || December 16, 2007 || Kitt Peak || Spacewatch || FLO || align=right data-sort-value="0.74" | 740 m || 
|-id=676 bgcolor=#fefefe
| 256676 ||  || — || December 18, 2007 || Kitt Peak || Spacewatch || NYS || align=right data-sort-value="0.81" | 810 m || 
|-id=677 bgcolor=#fefefe
| 256677 ||  || — || December 18, 2007 || Kitt Peak || Spacewatch || — || align=right data-sort-value="0.94" | 940 m || 
|-id=678 bgcolor=#fefefe
| 256678 ||  || — || December 30, 2007 || Socorro || LINEAR || — || align=right | 1.4 km || 
|-id=679 bgcolor=#fefefe
| 256679 ||  || — || December 30, 2007 || Mount Lemmon || Mount Lemmon Survey || — || align=right data-sort-value="0.93" | 930 m || 
|-id=680 bgcolor=#fefefe
| 256680 ||  || — || December 30, 2007 || Catalina || CSS || NYS || align=right data-sort-value="0.69" | 690 m || 
|-id=681 bgcolor=#fefefe
| 256681 ||  || — || December 30, 2007 || Kitt Peak || Spacewatch || V || align=right data-sort-value="0.99" | 990 m || 
|-id=682 bgcolor=#fefefe
| 256682 ||  || — || December 30, 2007 || Catalina || CSS || — || align=right | 1.4 km || 
|-id=683 bgcolor=#E9E9E9
| 256683 ||  || — || December 30, 2007 || Mount Lemmon || Mount Lemmon Survey || — || align=right | 1.0 km || 
|-id=684 bgcolor=#fefefe
| 256684 ||  || — || December 30, 2007 || Mount Lemmon || Mount Lemmon Survey || MAS || align=right data-sort-value="0.61" | 610 m || 
|-id=685 bgcolor=#fefefe
| 256685 ||  || — || December 30, 2007 || Kitt Peak || Spacewatch || V || align=right | 1.1 km || 
|-id=686 bgcolor=#FA8072
| 256686 ||  || — || December 31, 2007 || Catalina || CSS || — || align=right | 1.4 km || 
|-id=687 bgcolor=#fefefe
| 256687 ||  || — || December 31, 2007 || Mount Lemmon || Mount Lemmon Survey || NYS || align=right data-sort-value="0.87" | 870 m || 
|-id=688 bgcolor=#fefefe
| 256688 ||  || — || December 31, 2007 || Mount Lemmon || Mount Lemmon Survey || — || align=right | 1.9 km || 
|-id=689 bgcolor=#fefefe
| 256689 ||  || — || December 18, 2007 || Mount Lemmon || Mount Lemmon Survey || — || align=right | 1.0 km || 
|-id=690 bgcolor=#fefefe
| 256690 ||  || — || December 30, 2007 || Kitt Peak || Spacewatch || — || align=right | 1.0 km || 
|-id=691 bgcolor=#fefefe
| 256691 ||  || — || December 30, 2007 || Mount Lemmon || Mount Lemmon Survey || — || align=right | 1.2 km || 
|-id=692 bgcolor=#fefefe
| 256692 ||  || — || December 31, 2007 || Mount Lemmon || Mount Lemmon Survey || — || align=right data-sort-value="0.77" | 770 m || 
|-id=693 bgcolor=#fefefe
| 256693 ||  || — || December 31, 2007 || Catalina || CSS || V || align=right data-sort-value="0.83" | 830 m || 
|-id=694 bgcolor=#E9E9E9
| 256694 ||  || — || December 31, 2007 || Mount Lemmon || Mount Lemmon Survey || MIS || align=right | 3.2 km || 
|-id=695 bgcolor=#d6d6d6
| 256695 ||  || — || December 18, 2007 || Mount Lemmon || Mount Lemmon Survey || — || align=right | 4.0 km || 
|-id=696 bgcolor=#fefefe
| 256696 ||  || — || January 7, 2008 || Wildberg || R. Apitzsch || FLO || align=right data-sort-value="0.94" | 940 m || 
|-id=697 bgcolor=#fefefe
| 256697 Nahapetov ||  ||  || January 6, 2008 || Zelenchukskaya || T. V. Kryachko || — || align=right | 1.4 km || 
|-id=698 bgcolor=#fefefe
| 256698 Zhuzhixin ||  ||  || January 7, 2008 || Lulin || Q.-z. Ye, H.-C. Lin || NYS || align=right data-sort-value="0.98" | 980 m || 
|-id=699 bgcolor=#E9E9E9
| 256699 Poudai ||  ||  || January 7, 2008 || Lulin Observatory || Q.-z. Ye, H.-C. Lin || — || align=right | 1.7 km || 
|-id=700 bgcolor=#fefefe
| 256700 ||  || — || January 8, 2008 || Dauban || F. Kugel || — || align=right | 1.1 km || 
|}

256701–256800 

|-bgcolor=#fefefe
| 256701 ||  || — || January 8, 2008 || Dauban || F. Kugel || FLO || align=right data-sort-value="0.72" | 720 m || 
|-id=702 bgcolor=#fefefe
| 256702 ||  || — || January 7, 2008 || Lulin || LUSS || — || align=right data-sort-value="0.87" | 870 m || 
|-id=703 bgcolor=#fefefe
| 256703 ||  || — || January 10, 2008 || Kitt Peak || Spacewatch || EUT || align=right | 1.0 km || 
|-id=704 bgcolor=#E9E9E9
| 256704 ||  || — || January 10, 2008 || Mount Lemmon || Mount Lemmon Survey || — || align=right | 2.6 km || 
|-id=705 bgcolor=#E9E9E9
| 256705 ||  || — || January 10, 2008 || Mount Lemmon || Mount Lemmon Survey || — || align=right | 2.3 km || 
|-id=706 bgcolor=#fefefe
| 256706 ||  || — || January 10, 2008 || Mount Lemmon || Mount Lemmon Survey || — || align=right data-sort-value="0.94" | 940 m || 
|-id=707 bgcolor=#fefefe
| 256707 ||  || — || January 10, 2008 || Mount Lemmon || Mount Lemmon Survey || — || align=right | 1.1 km || 
|-id=708 bgcolor=#fefefe
| 256708 ||  || — || January 10, 2008 || Mount Lemmon || Mount Lemmon Survey || ERI || align=right | 1.9 km || 
|-id=709 bgcolor=#fefefe
| 256709 ||  || — || January 9, 2008 || Lulin || LUSS || NYS || align=right data-sort-value="0.96" | 960 m || 
|-id=710 bgcolor=#fefefe
| 256710 ||  || — || January 10, 2008 || Kitt Peak || Spacewatch || — || align=right data-sort-value="0.84" | 840 m || 
|-id=711 bgcolor=#fefefe
| 256711 ||  || — || January 10, 2008 || Kitt Peak || Spacewatch || NYS || align=right data-sort-value="0.98" | 980 m || 
|-id=712 bgcolor=#E9E9E9
| 256712 ||  || — || January 10, 2008 || Mount Lemmon || Mount Lemmon Survey || — || align=right | 2.4 km || 
|-id=713 bgcolor=#fefefe
| 256713 ||  || — || January 10, 2008 || Kitt Peak || Spacewatch || — || align=right | 1.1 km || 
|-id=714 bgcolor=#fefefe
| 256714 ||  || — || January 10, 2008 || Kitt Peak || Spacewatch || — || align=right data-sort-value="0.98" | 980 m || 
|-id=715 bgcolor=#fefefe
| 256715 ||  || — || January 11, 2008 || Kitt Peak || Spacewatch || NYS || align=right data-sort-value="0.93" | 930 m || 
|-id=716 bgcolor=#E9E9E9
| 256716 ||  || — || January 11, 2008 || Kitt Peak || Spacewatch || — || align=right | 1.2 km || 
|-id=717 bgcolor=#E9E9E9
| 256717 ||  || — || January 11, 2008 || Kitt Peak || Spacewatch || — || align=right | 1.7 km || 
|-id=718 bgcolor=#fefefe
| 256718 ||  || — || January 11, 2008 || Kitt Peak || Spacewatch || NYS || align=right data-sort-value="0.97" | 970 m || 
|-id=719 bgcolor=#fefefe
| 256719 ||  || — || January 11, 2008 || Mount Lemmon || Mount Lemmon Survey || — || align=right data-sort-value="0.77" | 770 m || 
|-id=720 bgcolor=#fefefe
| 256720 ||  || — || January 11, 2008 || Mount Lemmon || Mount Lemmon Survey || V || align=right data-sort-value="0.81" | 810 m || 
|-id=721 bgcolor=#fefefe
| 256721 ||  || — || January 11, 2008 || Kitt Peak || Spacewatch || — || align=right data-sort-value="0.98" | 980 m || 
|-id=722 bgcolor=#fefefe
| 256722 ||  || — || January 11, 2008 || Kitt Peak || Spacewatch || NYS || align=right | 2.3 km || 
|-id=723 bgcolor=#fefefe
| 256723 ||  || — || January 10, 2008 || Mount Lemmon || Mount Lemmon Survey || — || align=right data-sort-value="0.91" | 910 m || 
|-id=724 bgcolor=#E9E9E9
| 256724 ||  || — || January 11, 2008 || Kitt Peak || Spacewatch || — || align=right | 1.2 km || 
|-id=725 bgcolor=#fefefe
| 256725 ||  || — || January 14, 2008 || Kitt Peak || Spacewatch || V || align=right data-sort-value="0.97" | 970 m || 
|-id=726 bgcolor=#fefefe
| 256726 ||  || — || January 13, 2008 || Mount Lemmon || Mount Lemmon Survey || FLO || align=right data-sort-value="0.66" | 660 m || 
|-id=727 bgcolor=#fefefe
| 256727 ||  || — || January 15, 2008 || Kitt Peak || Spacewatch || — || align=right data-sort-value="0.91" | 910 m || 
|-id=728 bgcolor=#fefefe
| 256728 ||  || — || January 15, 2008 || Kitt Peak || Spacewatch || V || align=right data-sort-value="0.81" | 810 m || 
|-id=729 bgcolor=#E9E9E9
| 256729 ||  || — || January 9, 2008 || Mount Lemmon || Mount Lemmon Survey || — || align=right | 3.2 km || 
|-id=730 bgcolor=#d6d6d6
| 256730 ||  || — || January 11, 2008 || Mount Lemmon || Mount Lemmon Survey || — || align=right | 4.1 km || 
|-id=731 bgcolor=#E9E9E9
| 256731 ||  || — || January 10, 2008 || Kitt Peak || Spacewatch || — || align=right | 1.6 km || 
|-id=732 bgcolor=#fefefe
| 256732 ||  || — || January 12, 2008 || Catalina || CSS || V || align=right data-sort-value="0.99" | 990 m || 
|-id=733 bgcolor=#E9E9E9
| 256733 ||  || — || January 10, 2008 || Mount Lemmon || Mount Lemmon Survey || — || align=right | 2.7 km || 
|-id=734 bgcolor=#fefefe
| 256734 ||  || — || January 14, 2008 || Kitt Peak || Spacewatch || V || align=right data-sort-value="0.84" | 840 m || 
|-id=735 bgcolor=#fefefe
| 256735 ||  || — || January 15, 2008 || Socorro || LINEAR || V || align=right data-sort-value="0.84" | 840 m || 
|-id=736 bgcolor=#fefefe
| 256736 ||  || — || January 16, 2008 || Kitt Peak || Spacewatch || — || align=right | 1.3 km || 
|-id=737 bgcolor=#E9E9E9
| 256737 ||  || — || January 16, 2008 || Kitt Peak || Spacewatch || — || align=right | 1.8 km || 
|-id=738 bgcolor=#E9E9E9
| 256738 ||  || — || January 16, 2008 || Kitt Peak || Spacewatch || — || align=right | 2.6 km || 
|-id=739 bgcolor=#E9E9E9
| 256739 ||  || — || January 28, 2008 || Lulin || LUSS || — || align=right | 1.4 km || 
|-id=740 bgcolor=#fefefe
| 256740 ||  || — || January 30, 2008 || Catalina || CSS || — || align=right | 1.3 km || 
|-id=741 bgcolor=#fefefe
| 256741 ||  || — || January 30, 2008 || Catalina || CSS || NYS || align=right data-sort-value="0.66" | 660 m || 
|-id=742 bgcolor=#fefefe
| 256742 ||  || — || January 30, 2008 || Mount Lemmon || Mount Lemmon Survey || MAS || align=right data-sort-value="0.80" | 800 m || 
|-id=743 bgcolor=#fefefe
| 256743 ||  || — || January 31, 2008 || Mount Lemmon || Mount Lemmon Survey || — || align=right | 1.0 km || 
|-id=744 bgcolor=#E9E9E9
| 256744 ||  || — || January 31, 2008 || Mount Lemmon || Mount Lemmon Survey || — || align=right | 3.4 km || 
|-id=745 bgcolor=#E9E9E9
| 256745 ||  || — || January 31, 2008 || Mount Lemmon || Mount Lemmon Survey || — || align=right | 2.5 km || 
|-id=746 bgcolor=#E9E9E9
| 256746 ||  || — || January 30, 2008 || Kitt Peak || Spacewatch || MAR || align=right | 1.6 km || 
|-id=747 bgcolor=#E9E9E9
| 256747 ||  || — || January 30, 2008 || Mount Lemmon || Mount Lemmon Survey || NEM || align=right | 2.4 km || 
|-id=748 bgcolor=#fefefe
| 256748 ||  || — || January 30, 2008 || Catalina || CSS || — || align=right data-sort-value="0.81" | 810 m || 
|-id=749 bgcolor=#fefefe
| 256749 ||  || — || January 30, 2008 || Catalina || CSS || NYS || align=right | 1.9 km || 
|-id=750 bgcolor=#fefefe
| 256750 ||  || — || January 30, 2008 || Catalina || CSS || — || align=right | 1.1 km || 
|-id=751 bgcolor=#fefefe
| 256751 ||  || — || January 30, 2008 || Mount Lemmon || Mount Lemmon Survey || EUT || align=right data-sort-value="0.73" | 730 m || 
|-id=752 bgcolor=#fefefe
| 256752 ||  || — || January 30, 2008 || Catalina || CSS || — || align=right data-sort-value="0.98" | 980 m || 
|-id=753 bgcolor=#E9E9E9
| 256753 ||  || — || January 30, 2008 || Catalina || CSS || — || align=right | 3.2 km || 
|-id=754 bgcolor=#E9E9E9
| 256754 ||  || — || January 30, 2008 || Mount Lemmon || Mount Lemmon Survey || EUN || align=right | 1.5 km || 
|-id=755 bgcolor=#E9E9E9
| 256755 ||  || — || January 30, 2008 || Mount Lemmon || Mount Lemmon Survey || — || align=right | 4.0 km || 
|-id=756 bgcolor=#E9E9E9
| 256756 ||  || — || January 30, 2008 || Kitt Peak || Spacewatch || — || align=right | 2.2 km || 
|-id=757 bgcolor=#fefefe
| 256757 ||  || — || January 31, 2008 || Catalina || CSS || — || align=right | 1.3 km || 
|-id=758 bgcolor=#fefefe
| 256758 ||  || — || January 31, 2008 || Catalina || CSS || — || align=right data-sort-value="0.81" | 810 m || 
|-id=759 bgcolor=#E9E9E9
| 256759 ||  || — || January 31, 2008 || Mount Lemmon || Mount Lemmon Survey || — || align=right | 2.5 km || 
|-id=760 bgcolor=#E9E9E9
| 256760 ||  || — || January 31, 2008 || Mount Lemmon || Mount Lemmon Survey || — || align=right | 4.0 km || 
|-id=761 bgcolor=#fefefe
| 256761 ||  || — || January 30, 2008 || Catalina || CSS || — || align=right | 1.1 km || 
|-id=762 bgcolor=#fefefe
| 256762 ||  || — || January 28, 2008 || La Sagra || OAM Obs. || — || align=right data-sort-value="0.94" | 940 m || 
|-id=763 bgcolor=#E9E9E9
| 256763 ||  || — || January 30, 2008 || Mount Lemmon || Mount Lemmon Survey || — || align=right data-sort-value="0.87" | 870 m || 
|-id=764 bgcolor=#E9E9E9
| 256764 ||  || — || January 30, 2008 || Mount Lemmon || Mount Lemmon Survey || — || align=right | 3.0 km || 
|-id=765 bgcolor=#E9E9E9
| 256765 ||  || — || January 30, 2008 || Mount Lemmon || Mount Lemmon Survey || HNS || align=right | 1.6 km || 
|-id=766 bgcolor=#E9E9E9
| 256766 ||  || — || January 20, 2008 || Mount Lemmon || Mount Lemmon Survey || ADE || align=right | 2.3 km || 
|-id=767 bgcolor=#E9E9E9
| 256767 ||  || — || January 30, 2008 || Mount Lemmon || Mount Lemmon Survey || — || align=right | 1.5 km || 
|-id=768 bgcolor=#E9E9E9
| 256768 ||  || — || January 30, 2008 || Mount Lemmon || Mount Lemmon Survey || — || align=right | 2.1 km || 
|-id=769 bgcolor=#fefefe
| 256769 ||  || — || January 20, 2008 || Mount Lemmon || Mount Lemmon Survey || MAS || align=right data-sort-value="0.65" | 650 m || 
|-id=770 bgcolor=#E9E9E9
| 256770 ||  || — || January 30, 2008 || Mount Lemmon || Mount Lemmon Survey || — || align=right | 2.3 km || 
|-id=771 bgcolor=#fefefe
| 256771 ||  || — || January 20, 2008 || Mount Lemmon || Mount Lemmon Survey || NYS || align=right data-sort-value="0.86" | 860 m || 
|-id=772 bgcolor=#fefefe
| 256772 ||  || — || January 16, 2008 || Socorro || LINEAR || — || align=right data-sort-value="0.95" | 950 m || 
|-id=773 bgcolor=#fefefe
| 256773 ||  || — || February 2, 2008 || Kitami || K. Endate || ERI || align=right | 2.1 km || 
|-id=774 bgcolor=#fefefe
| 256774 ||  || — || February 3, 2008 || Bisei SG Center || BATTeRS || FLO || align=right data-sort-value="0.84" | 840 m || 
|-id=775 bgcolor=#fefefe
| 256775 ||  || — || February 2, 2008 || Mount Lemmon || Mount Lemmon Survey || — || align=right | 2.6 km || 
|-id=776 bgcolor=#fefefe
| 256776 ||  || — || February 4, 2008 || Uccle || T. Pauwels || — || align=right | 1.1 km || 
|-id=777 bgcolor=#E9E9E9
| 256777 ||  || — || February 1, 2008 || Kitt Peak || Spacewatch || — || align=right | 1.5 km || 
|-id=778 bgcolor=#fefefe
| 256778 ||  || — || February 3, 2008 || Catalina || CSS || V || align=right | 1.1 km || 
|-id=779 bgcolor=#fefefe
| 256779 ||  || — || February 3, 2008 || Kitt Peak || Spacewatch || — || align=right | 1.3 km || 
|-id=780 bgcolor=#fefefe
| 256780 ||  || — || February 3, 2008 || Kitt Peak || Spacewatch || V || align=right | 1.0 km || 
|-id=781 bgcolor=#E9E9E9
| 256781 ||  || — || February 3, 2008 || Kitt Peak || Spacewatch || — || align=right | 1.4 km || 
|-id=782 bgcolor=#fefefe
| 256782 ||  || — || February 3, 2008 || Kitt Peak || Spacewatch || MAS || align=right data-sort-value="0.67" | 670 m || 
|-id=783 bgcolor=#d6d6d6
| 256783 ||  || — || February 3, 2008 || Kitt Peak || Spacewatch || — || align=right | 3.4 km || 
|-id=784 bgcolor=#fefefe
| 256784 ||  || — || February 3, 2008 || Kitt Peak || Spacewatch || — || align=right data-sort-value="0.85" | 850 m || 
|-id=785 bgcolor=#E9E9E9
| 256785 ||  || — || February 3, 2008 || Kitt Peak || Spacewatch || HEN || align=right | 1.3 km || 
|-id=786 bgcolor=#fefefe
| 256786 ||  || — || February 6, 2008 || Catalina || CSS || — || align=right data-sort-value="0.86" | 860 m || 
|-id=787 bgcolor=#fefefe
| 256787 ||  || — || February 1, 2008 || Kitt Peak || Spacewatch || — || align=right data-sort-value="0.79" | 790 m || 
|-id=788 bgcolor=#fefefe
| 256788 ||  || — || February 2, 2008 || Kitt Peak || Spacewatch || — || align=right | 1.2 km || 
|-id=789 bgcolor=#fefefe
| 256789 ||  || — || February 2, 2008 || Catalina || CSS || ERI || align=right | 2.5 km || 
|-id=790 bgcolor=#fefefe
| 256790 ||  || — || February 3, 2008 || Kitt Peak || Spacewatch || — || align=right | 1.5 km || 
|-id=791 bgcolor=#d6d6d6
| 256791 ||  || — || February 3, 2008 || Kitt Peak || Spacewatch || — || align=right | 3.2 km || 
|-id=792 bgcolor=#fefefe
| 256792 ||  || — || February 6, 2008 || Catalina || CSS || ERI || align=right | 2.7 km || 
|-id=793 bgcolor=#fefefe
| 256793 ||  || — || February 6, 2008 || Kitt Peak || Spacewatch || V || align=right data-sort-value="0.71" | 710 m || 
|-id=794 bgcolor=#fefefe
| 256794 ||  || — || February 8, 2008 || Kitt Peak || Spacewatch || — || align=right | 1.1 km || 
|-id=795 bgcolor=#E9E9E9
| 256795 Suzyzahn ||  ||  || February 7, 2008 || Saint-Sulpice || B. Christophe || — || align=right | 3.0 km || 
|-id=796 bgcolor=#E9E9E9
| 256796 Almanzor ||  ||  || February 8, 2008 || La Cañada || J. Lacruz || — || align=right | 1.0 km || 
|-id=797 bgcolor=#fefefe
| 256797 Benbow ||  ||  || February 9, 2008 || La Cañada || J. Lacruz || — || align=right data-sort-value="0.81" | 810 m || 
|-id=798 bgcolor=#E9E9E9
| 256798 ||  || — || February 7, 2008 || Catalina || CSS || RAF || align=right | 1.3 km || 
|-id=799 bgcolor=#d6d6d6
| 256799 ||  || — || February 7, 2008 || Catalina || CSS || BRA || align=right | 2.6 km || 
|-id=800 bgcolor=#E9E9E9
| 256800 ||  || — || February 3, 2008 || Kitt Peak || Spacewatch || — || align=right | 2.8 km || 
|}

256801–256900 

|-bgcolor=#E9E9E9
| 256801 ||  || — || February 7, 2008 || Kitt Peak || Spacewatch || — || align=right | 2.0 km || 
|-id=802 bgcolor=#fefefe
| 256802 ||  || — || February 7, 2008 || Kitt Peak || Spacewatch || V || align=right data-sort-value="0.90" | 900 m || 
|-id=803 bgcolor=#d6d6d6
| 256803 ||  || — || February 7, 2008 || Kitt Peak || Spacewatch || — || align=right | 4.4 km || 
|-id=804 bgcolor=#E9E9E9
| 256804 ||  || — || February 7, 2008 || Mount Lemmon || Mount Lemmon Survey || — || align=right | 1.9 km || 
|-id=805 bgcolor=#fefefe
| 256805 ||  || — || February 8, 2008 || Kitt Peak || Spacewatch || NYS || align=right data-sort-value="0.83" | 830 m || 
|-id=806 bgcolor=#fefefe
| 256806 ||  || — || February 8, 2008 || Kitt Peak || Spacewatch || NYS || align=right data-sort-value="0.86" | 860 m || 
|-id=807 bgcolor=#fefefe
| 256807 ||  || — || February 8, 2008 || Kitt Peak || Spacewatch || — || align=right data-sort-value="0.90" | 900 m || 
|-id=808 bgcolor=#E9E9E9
| 256808 ||  || — || February 8, 2008 || Kitt Peak || Spacewatch || — || align=right | 2.9 km || 
|-id=809 bgcolor=#E9E9E9
| 256809 ||  || — || February 9, 2008 || Mount Lemmon || Mount Lemmon Survey || — || align=right | 2.8 km || 
|-id=810 bgcolor=#d6d6d6
| 256810 ||  || — || February 9, 2008 || Kitt Peak || Spacewatch || — || align=right | 4.9 km || 
|-id=811 bgcolor=#E9E9E9
| 256811 ||  || — || February 10, 2008 || Kitt Peak || Spacewatch || MAR || align=right | 1.4 km || 
|-id=812 bgcolor=#E9E9E9
| 256812 ||  || — || February 10, 2008 || Mount Lemmon || Mount Lemmon Survey || PAD || align=right | 1.8 km || 
|-id=813 bgcolor=#E9E9E9
| 256813 Marburg ||  ||  || February 11, 2008 || Taunus || E. Schwab, R. Kling || — || align=right | 3.2 km || 
|-id=814 bgcolor=#d6d6d6
| 256814 ||  || — || February 11, 2008 || Junk Bond || D. Healy || TEL || align=right | 1.6 km || 
|-id=815 bgcolor=#fefefe
| 256815 ||  || — || February 6, 2008 || Catalina || CSS || — || align=right | 1.0 km || 
|-id=816 bgcolor=#fefefe
| 256816 ||  || — || February 6, 2008 || Anderson Mesa || LONEOS || — || align=right | 1.2 km || 
|-id=817 bgcolor=#E9E9E9
| 256817 ||  || — || February 6, 2008 || Purple Mountain || PMO NEO || — || align=right | 4.3 km || 
|-id=818 bgcolor=#fefefe
| 256818 ||  || — || February 7, 2008 || Mount Lemmon || Mount Lemmon Survey || — || align=right | 1.1 km || 
|-id=819 bgcolor=#d6d6d6
| 256819 ||  || — || February 8, 2008 || Kitt Peak || Spacewatch || — || align=right | 4.2 km || 
|-id=820 bgcolor=#d6d6d6
| 256820 ||  || — || February 8, 2008 || Mount Lemmon || Mount Lemmon Survey || — || align=right | 3.1 km || 
|-id=821 bgcolor=#E9E9E9
| 256821 ||  || — || February 8, 2008 || Kitt Peak || Spacewatch || AGN || align=right | 1.5 km || 
|-id=822 bgcolor=#fefefe
| 256822 ||  || — || February 8, 2008 || Mount Lemmon || Mount Lemmon Survey || — || align=right data-sort-value="0.80" | 800 m || 
|-id=823 bgcolor=#E9E9E9
| 256823 ||  || — || February 8, 2008 || Kitt Peak || Spacewatch || — || align=right | 2.0 km || 
|-id=824 bgcolor=#fefefe
| 256824 ||  || — || February 8, 2008 || Kitt Peak || Spacewatch || NYS || align=right data-sort-value="0.91" | 910 m || 
|-id=825 bgcolor=#E9E9E9
| 256825 ||  || — || February 8, 2008 || Kitt Peak || Spacewatch || — || align=right | 2.8 km || 
|-id=826 bgcolor=#E9E9E9
| 256826 ||  || — || February 8, 2008 || Kitt Peak || Spacewatch || PAD || align=right | 2.3 km || 
|-id=827 bgcolor=#E9E9E9
| 256827 ||  || — || February 8, 2008 || Kitt Peak || Spacewatch || WIT || align=right | 1.2 km || 
|-id=828 bgcolor=#E9E9E9
| 256828 ||  || — || February 8, 2008 || Kitt Peak || Spacewatch || — || align=right | 2.6 km || 
|-id=829 bgcolor=#fefefe
| 256829 ||  || — || February 9, 2008 || Kitt Peak || Spacewatch || MAS || align=right data-sort-value="0.80" | 800 m || 
|-id=830 bgcolor=#fefefe
| 256830 ||  || — || February 9, 2008 || Kitt Peak || Spacewatch || — || align=right data-sort-value="0.98" | 980 m || 
|-id=831 bgcolor=#fefefe
| 256831 ||  || — || February 9, 2008 || Kitt Peak || Spacewatch || — || align=right data-sort-value="0.88" | 880 m || 
|-id=832 bgcolor=#fefefe
| 256832 ||  || — || February 9, 2008 || Kitt Peak || Spacewatch || CLA || align=right | 1.6 km || 
|-id=833 bgcolor=#E9E9E9
| 256833 ||  || — || February 9, 2008 || Kitt Peak || Spacewatch || NEM || align=right | 2.9 km || 
|-id=834 bgcolor=#E9E9E9
| 256834 ||  || — || February 9, 2008 || Kitt Peak || Spacewatch || — || align=right | 2.3 km || 
|-id=835 bgcolor=#E9E9E9
| 256835 ||  || — || February 9, 2008 || Kitt Peak || Spacewatch || WIT || align=right | 1.1 km || 
|-id=836 bgcolor=#E9E9E9
| 256836 ||  || — || February 9, 2008 || Kitt Peak || Spacewatch || — || align=right | 2.6 km || 
|-id=837 bgcolor=#fefefe
| 256837 ||  || — || February 9, 2008 || Catalina || CSS || V || align=right data-sort-value="0.99" | 990 m || 
|-id=838 bgcolor=#E9E9E9
| 256838 ||  || — || February 9, 2008 || Catalina || CSS || — || align=right | 2.2 km || 
|-id=839 bgcolor=#E9E9E9
| 256839 ||  || — || February 9, 2008 || Catalina || CSS || HNS || align=right | 1.8 km || 
|-id=840 bgcolor=#fefefe
| 256840 ||  || — || February 9, 2008 || Kitt Peak || Spacewatch || NYS || align=right data-sort-value="0.80" | 800 m || 
|-id=841 bgcolor=#E9E9E9
| 256841 ||  || — || February 9, 2008 || Kitt Peak || Spacewatch || — || align=right | 3.6 km || 
|-id=842 bgcolor=#d6d6d6
| 256842 ||  || — || February 9, 2008 || Kitt Peak || Spacewatch || — || align=right | 5.5 km || 
|-id=843 bgcolor=#fefefe
| 256843 ||  || — || February 10, 2008 || Catalina || CSS || V || align=right data-sort-value="0.91" | 910 m || 
|-id=844 bgcolor=#E9E9E9
| 256844 ||  || — || February 10, 2008 || Catalina || CSS || MRX || align=right | 1.3 km || 
|-id=845 bgcolor=#fefefe
| 256845 ||  || — || February 12, 2008 || Mount Lemmon || Mount Lemmon Survey || — || align=right | 1.3 km || 
|-id=846 bgcolor=#E9E9E9
| 256846 ||  || — || February 12, 2008 || Mount Lemmon || Mount Lemmon Survey || — || align=right data-sort-value="0.89" | 890 m || 
|-id=847 bgcolor=#fefefe
| 256847 ||  || — || February 6, 2008 || Socorro || LINEAR || — || align=right | 1.1 km || 
|-id=848 bgcolor=#E9E9E9
| 256848 ||  || — || February 6, 2008 || Socorro || LINEAR || — || align=right | 2.2 km || 
|-id=849 bgcolor=#d6d6d6
| 256849 ||  || — || February 8, 2008 || Catalina || CSS || EUP || align=right | 7.8 km || 
|-id=850 bgcolor=#E9E9E9
| 256850 ||  || — || February 9, 2008 || Catalina || CSS || — || align=right | 1.6 km || 
|-id=851 bgcolor=#E9E9E9
| 256851 ||  || — || February 11, 2008 || Mount Lemmon || Mount Lemmon Survey || — || align=right | 1.2 km || 
|-id=852 bgcolor=#d6d6d6
| 256852 ||  || — || February 13, 2008 || Mount Lemmon || Mount Lemmon Survey || KAR || align=right | 1.4 km || 
|-id=853 bgcolor=#d6d6d6
| 256853 ||  || — || February 1, 2008 || Kitt Peak || Spacewatch || — || align=right | 2.7 km || 
|-id=854 bgcolor=#d6d6d6
| 256854 ||  || — || February 8, 2008 || Mount Lemmon || Mount Lemmon Survey || — || align=right | 3.0 km || 
|-id=855 bgcolor=#d6d6d6
| 256855 ||  || — || February 10, 2008 || Mount Lemmon || Mount Lemmon Survey || TIR || align=right | 3.6 km || 
|-id=856 bgcolor=#E9E9E9
| 256856 ||  || — || February 11, 2008 || Mount Lemmon || Mount Lemmon Survey || — || align=right | 1.8 km || 
|-id=857 bgcolor=#E9E9E9
| 256857 ||  || — || February 13, 2008 || Kitt Peak || Spacewatch || — || align=right | 2.6 km || 
|-id=858 bgcolor=#E9E9E9
| 256858 ||  || — || February 10, 2008 || Mount Lemmon || Mount Lemmon Survey || — || align=right | 2.9 km || 
|-id=859 bgcolor=#E9E9E9
| 256859 ||  || — || February 9, 2008 || Mount Lemmon || Mount Lemmon Survey || — || align=right | 4.0 km || 
|-id=860 bgcolor=#E9E9E9
| 256860 ||  || — || February 10, 2008 || Kitt Peak || Spacewatch || MAR || align=right | 1.2 km || 
|-id=861 bgcolor=#d6d6d6
| 256861 ||  || — || February 11, 2008 || Mount Lemmon || Mount Lemmon Survey || EOS || align=right | 2.5 km || 
|-id=862 bgcolor=#d6d6d6
| 256862 ||  || — || February 13, 2008 || Mount Lemmon || Mount Lemmon Survey || EOS || align=right | 3.9 km || 
|-id=863 bgcolor=#E9E9E9
| 256863 ||  || — || February 13, 2008 || Mount Lemmon || Mount Lemmon Survey || GER || align=right | 2.3 km || 
|-id=864 bgcolor=#fefefe
| 256864 || 2008 DK || — || February 24, 2008 || Skylive Obs. || F. Tozzi || FLO || align=right data-sort-value="0.75" | 750 m || 
|-id=865 bgcolor=#fefefe
| 256865 ||  || — || February 24, 2008 || Kitt Peak || Spacewatch || KLI || align=right | 2.4 km || 
|-id=866 bgcolor=#fefefe
| 256866 ||  || — || February 24, 2008 || Kitt Peak || Spacewatch || — || align=right data-sort-value="0.72" | 720 m || 
|-id=867 bgcolor=#fefefe
| 256867 ||  || — || February 24, 2008 || Kitt Peak || Spacewatch || MAS || align=right data-sort-value="0.68" | 680 m || 
|-id=868 bgcolor=#E9E9E9
| 256868 ||  || — || February 24, 2008 || Mount Lemmon || Mount Lemmon Survey || — || align=right | 1.2 km || 
|-id=869 bgcolor=#fefefe
| 256869 ||  || — || February 26, 2008 || Kitt Peak || Spacewatch || MAS || align=right data-sort-value="0.82" | 820 m || 
|-id=870 bgcolor=#E9E9E9
| 256870 ||  || — || February 26, 2008 || Kitt Peak || Spacewatch || — || align=right | 2.4 km || 
|-id=871 bgcolor=#E9E9E9
| 256871 ||  || — || February 26, 2008 || Mount Lemmon || Mount Lemmon Survey || XIZ || align=right | 1.8 km || 
|-id=872 bgcolor=#E9E9E9
| 256872 ||  || — || February 26, 2008 || Mount Lemmon || Mount Lemmon Survey || — || align=right | 1.2 km || 
|-id=873 bgcolor=#fefefe
| 256873 ||  || — || February 27, 2008 || Kitt Peak || Spacewatch || ERI || align=right | 1.8 km || 
|-id=874 bgcolor=#E9E9E9
| 256874 ||  || — || February 28, 2008 || Calvin-Rehoboth || Calvin–Rehoboth Obs. || — || align=right | 3.6 km || 
|-id=875 bgcolor=#E9E9E9
| 256875 ||  || — || February 27, 2008 || Mount Lemmon || Mount Lemmon Survey || — || align=right | 1.4 km || 
|-id=876 bgcolor=#E9E9E9
| 256876 ||  || — || February 28, 2008 || Mount Lemmon || Mount Lemmon Survey || — || align=right | 2.0 km || 
|-id=877 bgcolor=#d6d6d6
| 256877 ||  || — || February 28, 2008 || Mount Lemmon || Mount Lemmon Survey || LAU || align=right | 1.6 km || 
|-id=878 bgcolor=#fefefe
| 256878 ||  || — || February 27, 2008 || Kitt Peak || Spacewatch || — || align=right data-sort-value="0.97" | 970 m || 
|-id=879 bgcolor=#E9E9E9
| 256879 ||  || — || February 27, 2008 || Kitt Peak || Spacewatch || — || align=right | 2.3 km || 
|-id=880 bgcolor=#E9E9E9
| 256880 ||  || — || February 27, 2008 || Kitt Peak || Spacewatch || PAD || align=right | 3.0 km || 
|-id=881 bgcolor=#d6d6d6
| 256881 ||  || — || February 27, 2008 || Kitt Peak || Spacewatch || KOR || align=right | 1.7 km || 
|-id=882 bgcolor=#E9E9E9
| 256882 ||  || — || February 27, 2008 || Kitt Peak || Spacewatch || — || align=right | 2.5 km || 
|-id=883 bgcolor=#d6d6d6
| 256883 ||  || — || February 27, 2008 || Mount Lemmon || Mount Lemmon Survey || THM || align=right | 2.5 km || 
|-id=884 bgcolor=#d6d6d6
| 256884 ||  || — || February 27, 2008 || Kitt Peak || Spacewatch || — || align=right | 4.2 km || 
|-id=885 bgcolor=#E9E9E9
| 256885 ||  || — || February 27, 2008 || Mount Lemmon || Mount Lemmon Survey || MRX || align=right | 1.7 km || 
|-id=886 bgcolor=#E9E9E9
| 256886 ||  || — || February 27, 2008 || Mount Lemmon || Mount Lemmon Survey || — || align=right | 1.5 km || 
|-id=887 bgcolor=#E9E9E9
| 256887 ||  || — || February 27, 2008 || Kitt Peak || Spacewatch || — || align=right | 2.6 km || 
|-id=888 bgcolor=#d6d6d6
| 256888 ||  || — || February 27, 2008 || Kitt Peak || Spacewatch || — || align=right | 4.1 km || 
|-id=889 bgcolor=#E9E9E9
| 256889 ||  || — || February 27, 2008 || Mount Lemmon || Mount Lemmon Survey || ADE || align=right | 2.9 km || 
|-id=890 bgcolor=#E9E9E9
| 256890 ||  || — || February 27, 2008 || Kitt Peak || Spacewatch || — || align=right | 2.4 km || 
|-id=891 bgcolor=#E9E9E9
| 256891 ||  || — || February 27, 2008 || Kitt Peak || Spacewatch || — || align=right | 1.1 km || 
|-id=892 bgcolor=#fefefe
| 256892 Wutayou ||  ||  || February 27, 2008 || Lulin Observatory || C.-S. Lin, Q.-z. Ye || NYS || align=right | 1.00 km || 
|-id=893 bgcolor=#fefefe
| 256893 ||  || — || February 28, 2008 || Mount Lemmon || Mount Lemmon Survey || NYS || align=right data-sort-value="0.72" | 720 m || 
|-id=894 bgcolor=#d6d6d6
| 256894 ||  || — || February 28, 2008 || Catalina || CSS || LIX || align=right | 5.1 km || 
|-id=895 bgcolor=#E9E9E9
| 256895 ||  || — || February 28, 2008 || Mount Lemmon || Mount Lemmon Survey || — || align=right | 2.4 km || 
|-id=896 bgcolor=#E9E9E9
| 256896 ||  || — || February 28, 2008 || Kitt Peak || Spacewatch || — || align=right | 3.4 km || 
|-id=897 bgcolor=#E9E9E9
| 256897 ||  || — || February 28, 2008 || Kitt Peak || Spacewatch || — || align=right | 2.6 km || 
|-id=898 bgcolor=#E9E9E9
| 256898 ||  || — || February 29, 2008 || Kitt Peak || Spacewatch || — || align=right | 3.4 km || 
|-id=899 bgcolor=#d6d6d6
| 256899 ||  || — || February 29, 2008 || Kitt Peak || Spacewatch || — || align=right | 3.9 km || 
|-id=900 bgcolor=#E9E9E9
| 256900 ||  || — || February 29, 2008 || Mount Lemmon || Mount Lemmon Survey || — || align=right | 2.7 km || 
|}

256901–257000 

|-bgcolor=#d6d6d6
| 256901 ||  || — || February 29, 2008 || Kitt Peak || Spacewatch || — || align=right | 3.4 km || 
|-id=902 bgcolor=#E9E9E9
| 256902 ||  || — || February 26, 2008 || Mount Lemmon || Mount Lemmon Survey || AGN || align=right | 1.9 km || 
|-id=903 bgcolor=#E9E9E9
| 256903 ||  || — || February 29, 2008 || Kitt Peak || Spacewatch || — || align=right | 1.7 km || 
|-id=904 bgcolor=#fefefe
| 256904 ||  || — || February 28, 2008 || Mount Lemmon || Mount Lemmon Survey || MAS || align=right data-sort-value="0.91" | 910 m || 
|-id=905 bgcolor=#E9E9E9
| 256905 ||  || — || February 29, 2008 || Kitt Peak || Spacewatch || — || align=right | 2.2 km || 
|-id=906 bgcolor=#d6d6d6
| 256906 ||  || — || February 29, 2008 || Kitt Peak || Spacewatch || — || align=right | 3.7 km || 
|-id=907 bgcolor=#d6d6d6
| 256907 ||  || — || February 24, 2008 || Mount Lemmon || Mount Lemmon Survey || — || align=right | 3.2 km || 
|-id=908 bgcolor=#fefefe
| 256908 ||  || — || February 26, 2008 || Mount Lemmon || Mount Lemmon Survey || — || align=right data-sort-value="0.91" | 910 m || 
|-id=909 bgcolor=#E9E9E9
| 256909 ||  || — || February 27, 2008 || Kitt Peak || Spacewatch || — || align=right | 3.0 km || 
|-id=910 bgcolor=#d6d6d6
| 256910 ||  || — || February 28, 2008 || Mount Lemmon || Mount Lemmon Survey || KOR || align=right | 2.0 km || 
|-id=911 bgcolor=#E9E9E9
| 256911 ||  || — || February 29, 2008 || Kitt Peak || Spacewatch || NEM || align=right | 2.8 km || 
|-id=912 bgcolor=#d6d6d6
| 256912 ||  || — || February 29, 2008 || Kitt Peak || Spacewatch || KAR || align=right | 1.4 km || 
|-id=913 bgcolor=#E9E9E9
| 256913 ||  || — || February 18, 2008 || Mount Lemmon || Mount Lemmon Survey || — || align=right | 3.0 km || 
|-id=914 bgcolor=#E9E9E9
| 256914 ||  || — || February 29, 2008 || Kitt Peak || Spacewatch || — || align=right | 2.7 km || 
|-id=915 bgcolor=#E9E9E9
| 256915 ||  || — || March 1, 2008 || Kitt Peak || Spacewatch || PAD || align=right | 1.7 km || 
|-id=916 bgcolor=#E9E9E9
| 256916 ||  || — || March 1, 2008 || Kitt Peak || Spacewatch || — || align=right data-sort-value="0.84" | 840 m || 
|-id=917 bgcolor=#fefefe
| 256917 ||  || — || March 1, 2008 || Anderson Mesa || LONEOS || SUL || align=right | 3.1 km || 
|-id=918 bgcolor=#fefefe
| 256918 ||  || — || March 1, 2008 || Kitt Peak || Spacewatch || CHL || align=right | 2.4 km || 
|-id=919 bgcolor=#fefefe
| 256919 ||  || — || March 3, 2008 || Dauban || F. Kugel || — || align=right | 1.0 km || 
|-id=920 bgcolor=#E9E9E9
| 256920 ||  || — || March 5, 2008 || Mount Lemmon || Mount Lemmon Survey || — || align=right data-sort-value="0.91" | 910 m || 
|-id=921 bgcolor=#E9E9E9
| 256921 ||  || — || March 1, 2008 || La Sagra || OAM Obs. || — || align=right | 2.5 km || 
|-id=922 bgcolor=#E9E9E9
| 256922 ||  || — || March 1, 2008 || Kitt Peak || Spacewatch || NEM || align=right | 2.6 km || 
|-id=923 bgcolor=#E9E9E9
| 256923 ||  || — || March 1, 2008 || Kitt Peak || Spacewatch || HOF || align=right | 4.1 km || 
|-id=924 bgcolor=#E9E9E9
| 256924 ||  || — || March 1, 2008 || Kitt Peak || Spacewatch || AGN || align=right | 1.5 km || 
|-id=925 bgcolor=#E9E9E9
| 256925 ||  || — || March 1, 2008 || Kitt Peak || Spacewatch || — || align=right | 2.5 km || 
|-id=926 bgcolor=#E9E9E9
| 256926 ||  || — || March 1, 2008 || Kitt Peak || Spacewatch || — || align=right | 1.5 km || 
|-id=927 bgcolor=#d6d6d6
| 256927 ||  || — || March 2, 2008 || Kitt Peak || Spacewatch || EOS || align=right | 2.5 km || 
|-id=928 bgcolor=#E9E9E9
| 256928 ||  || — || March 2, 2008 || Kitt Peak || Spacewatch || AGN || align=right | 1.7 km || 
|-id=929 bgcolor=#fefefe
| 256929 ||  || — || March 3, 2008 || Catalina || CSS || — || align=right | 1.2 km || 
|-id=930 bgcolor=#E9E9E9
| 256930 ||  || — || March 4, 2008 || Kitt Peak || Spacewatch || HOF || align=right | 2.7 km || 
|-id=931 bgcolor=#d6d6d6
| 256931 ||  || — || March 4, 2008 || Mount Lemmon || Mount Lemmon Survey || HYG || align=right | 4.3 km || 
|-id=932 bgcolor=#E9E9E9
| 256932 ||  || — || March 4, 2008 || Mount Lemmon || Mount Lemmon Survey || EUN || align=right | 1.4 km || 
|-id=933 bgcolor=#d6d6d6
| 256933 ||  || — || March 4, 2008 || Mount Lemmon || Mount Lemmon Survey || — || align=right | 5.1 km || 
|-id=934 bgcolor=#E9E9E9
| 256934 ||  || — || March 8, 2008 || Grove Creek || F. Tozzi || — || align=right | 2.9 km || 
|-id=935 bgcolor=#E9E9E9
| 256935 ||  || — || March 2, 2008 || Kitt Peak || Spacewatch || — || align=right | 3.3 km || 
|-id=936 bgcolor=#d6d6d6
| 256936 ||  || — || March 4, 2008 || Kitt Peak || Spacewatch || — || align=right | 4.9 km || 
|-id=937 bgcolor=#fefefe
| 256937 ||  || — || March 4, 2008 || Kitt Peak || Spacewatch || — || align=right data-sort-value="0.88" | 880 m || 
|-id=938 bgcolor=#E9E9E9
| 256938 ||  || — || March 4, 2008 || Kitt Peak || Spacewatch || — || align=right | 1.3 km || 
|-id=939 bgcolor=#E9E9E9
| 256939 ||  || — || March 4, 2008 || Kitt Peak || Spacewatch || — || align=right | 2.4 km || 
|-id=940 bgcolor=#E9E9E9
| 256940 ||  || — || March 4, 2008 || Kitt Peak || Spacewatch || — || align=right | 1.6 km || 
|-id=941 bgcolor=#E9E9E9
| 256941 ||  || — || March 4, 2008 || Kitt Peak || Spacewatch || WIT || align=right | 1.2 km || 
|-id=942 bgcolor=#E9E9E9
| 256942 ||  || — || March 4, 2008 || Kitt Peak || Spacewatch || — || align=right | 1.0 km || 
|-id=943 bgcolor=#E9E9E9
| 256943 ||  || — || March 5, 2008 || Kitt Peak || Spacewatch || HNS || align=right | 1.5 km || 
|-id=944 bgcolor=#E9E9E9
| 256944 ||  || — || March 5, 2008 || Kitt Peak || Spacewatch || DOR || align=right | 2.4 km || 
|-id=945 bgcolor=#fefefe
| 256945 ||  || — || March 5, 2008 || Kitt Peak || Spacewatch || — || align=right | 2.2 km || 
|-id=946 bgcolor=#E9E9E9
| 256946 ||  || — || March 5, 2008 || Kitt Peak || Spacewatch || — || align=right | 1.9 km || 
|-id=947 bgcolor=#E9E9E9
| 256947 ||  || — || March 6, 2008 || Kitt Peak || Spacewatch || HOF || align=right | 3.4 km || 
|-id=948 bgcolor=#E9E9E9
| 256948 ||  || — || March 6, 2008 || Kitt Peak || Spacewatch || — || align=right | 2.1 km || 
|-id=949 bgcolor=#E9E9E9
| 256949 ||  || — || March 8, 2008 || Mount Lemmon || Mount Lemmon Survey || — || align=right | 1.1 km || 
|-id=950 bgcolor=#d6d6d6
| 256950 ||  || — || March 8, 2008 || Catalina || CSS || — || align=right | 3.4 km || 
|-id=951 bgcolor=#E9E9E9
| 256951 ||  || — || March 9, 2008 || Desert Moon || B. L. Stevens || — || align=right | 2.0 km || 
|-id=952 bgcolor=#E9E9E9
| 256952 ||  || — || March 5, 2008 || Mount Lemmon || Mount Lemmon Survey || WIT || align=right | 1.4 km || 
|-id=953 bgcolor=#E9E9E9
| 256953 ||  || — || March 6, 2008 || Mount Lemmon || Mount Lemmon Survey || — || align=right | 3.1 km || 
|-id=954 bgcolor=#E9E9E9
| 256954 ||  || — || March 6, 2008 || Mount Lemmon || Mount Lemmon Survey || — || align=right | 2.1 km || 
|-id=955 bgcolor=#E9E9E9
| 256955 ||  || — || March 7, 2008 || Kitt Peak || Spacewatch || — || align=right | 1.1 km || 
|-id=956 bgcolor=#d6d6d6
| 256956 ||  || — || March 7, 2008 || Kitt Peak || Spacewatch || — || align=right | 3.7 km || 
|-id=957 bgcolor=#E9E9E9
| 256957 ||  || — || March 7, 2008 || Kitt Peak || Spacewatch || — || align=right | 1.6 km || 
|-id=958 bgcolor=#fefefe
| 256958 ||  || — || March 7, 2008 || Kitt Peak || Spacewatch || NYS || align=right data-sort-value="0.67" | 670 m || 
|-id=959 bgcolor=#E9E9E9
| 256959 ||  || — || March 7, 2008 || Kitt Peak || Spacewatch || AGN || align=right | 1.4 km || 
|-id=960 bgcolor=#d6d6d6
| 256960 ||  || — || March 8, 2008 || Socorro || LINEAR || — || align=right | 5.3 km || 
|-id=961 bgcolor=#fefefe
| 256961 ||  || — || March 8, 2008 || Socorro || LINEAR || — || align=right | 1.2 km || 
|-id=962 bgcolor=#d6d6d6
| 256962 ||  || — || March 8, 2008 || Catalina || CSS || — || align=right | 3.8 km || 
|-id=963 bgcolor=#E9E9E9
| 256963 ||  || — || March 13, 2008 || Grove Creek || F. Tozzi || — || align=right | 2.5 km || 
|-id=964 bgcolor=#E9E9E9
| 256964 ||  || — || March 7, 2008 || Kitt Peak || Spacewatch || HEN || align=right | 1.4 km || 
|-id=965 bgcolor=#d6d6d6
| 256965 ||  || — || March 8, 2008 || Catalina || CSS || — || align=right | 3.2 km || 
|-id=966 bgcolor=#d6d6d6
| 256966 ||  || — || March 9, 2008 || Socorro || LINEAR || — || align=right | 4.4 km || 
|-id=967 bgcolor=#E9E9E9
| 256967 ||  || — || March 10, 2008 || Nyukasa || Mount Nyukasa Stn. || — || align=right | 2.8 km || 
|-id=968 bgcolor=#E9E9E9
| 256968 ||  || — || March 6, 2008 || Kitt Peak || Spacewatch || — || align=right | 1.6 km || 
|-id=969 bgcolor=#E9E9E9
| 256969 ||  || — || March 5, 2008 || Mount Lemmon || Mount Lemmon Survey || HOF || align=right | 3.3 km || 
|-id=970 bgcolor=#E9E9E9
| 256970 ||  || — || March 11, 2008 || Mount Lemmon || Mount Lemmon Survey || HNS || align=right | 1.7 km || 
|-id=971 bgcolor=#fefefe
| 256971 ||  || — || March 3, 2008 || Catalina || CSS || — || align=right data-sort-value="0.67" | 670 m || 
|-id=972 bgcolor=#E9E9E9
| 256972 ||  || — || March 5, 2008 || Mount Lemmon || Mount Lemmon Survey || — || align=right | 3.1 km || 
|-id=973 bgcolor=#E9E9E9
| 256973 ||  || — || March 6, 2008 || Kitt Peak || Spacewatch || — || align=right | 3.7 km || 
|-id=974 bgcolor=#E9E9E9
| 256974 ||  || — || March 7, 2008 || Mount Lemmon || Mount Lemmon Survey || — || align=right | 2.0 km || 
|-id=975 bgcolor=#d6d6d6
| 256975 ||  || — || March 8, 2008 || Kitt Peak || Spacewatch || — || align=right | 2.8 km || 
|-id=976 bgcolor=#E9E9E9
| 256976 ||  || — || March 8, 2008 || Kitt Peak || Spacewatch || EUN || align=right | 2.0 km || 
|-id=977 bgcolor=#E9E9E9
| 256977 ||  || — || March 9, 2008 || Kitt Peak || Spacewatch || — || align=right | 2.0 km || 
|-id=978 bgcolor=#E9E9E9
| 256978 ||  || — || March 9, 2008 || Kitt Peak || Spacewatch || EUN || align=right | 1.6 km || 
|-id=979 bgcolor=#d6d6d6
| 256979 ||  || — || March 9, 2008 || Kitt Peak || Spacewatch || — || align=right | 3.3 km || 
|-id=980 bgcolor=#E9E9E9
| 256980 ||  || — || March 9, 2008 || Kitt Peak || Spacewatch || — || align=right | 1.8 km || 
|-id=981 bgcolor=#d6d6d6
| 256981 ||  || — || March 9, 2008 || Kitt Peak || Spacewatch || — || align=right | 3.3 km || 
|-id=982 bgcolor=#E9E9E9
| 256982 ||  || — || March 9, 2008 || Kitt Peak || Spacewatch || — || align=right | 1.9 km || 
|-id=983 bgcolor=#d6d6d6
| 256983 ||  || — || March 10, 2008 || Kitt Peak || Spacewatch || — || align=right | 2.9 km || 
|-id=984 bgcolor=#E9E9E9
| 256984 ||  || — || March 10, 2008 || Catalina || CSS || — || align=right | 2.7 km || 
|-id=985 bgcolor=#E9E9E9
| 256985 ||  || — || March 11, 2008 || Kitt Peak || Spacewatch || — || align=right | 2.3 km || 
|-id=986 bgcolor=#E9E9E9
| 256986 ||  || — || March 11, 2008 || Kitt Peak || Spacewatch || HOF || align=right | 4.2 km || 
|-id=987 bgcolor=#E9E9E9
| 256987 ||  || — || March 11, 2008 || Catalina || CSS || — || align=right | 2.1 km || 
|-id=988 bgcolor=#d6d6d6
| 256988 ||  || — || March 11, 2008 || Mount Lemmon || Mount Lemmon Survey || — || align=right | 3.9 km || 
|-id=989 bgcolor=#d6d6d6
| 256989 ||  || — || March 11, 2008 || Kitt Peak || Spacewatch || BRA || align=right | 1.9 km || 
|-id=990 bgcolor=#d6d6d6
| 256990 ||  || — || March 11, 2008 || Kitt Peak || Spacewatch || — || align=right | 3.2 km || 
|-id=991 bgcolor=#fefefe
| 256991 ||  || — || March 11, 2008 || Catalina || CSS || NYS || align=right data-sort-value="0.87" | 870 m || 
|-id=992 bgcolor=#fefefe
| 256992 ||  || — || March 12, 2008 || Kitt Peak || Spacewatch || MAS || align=right data-sort-value="0.65" | 650 m || 
|-id=993 bgcolor=#E9E9E9
| 256993 ||  || — || March 12, 2008 || Mount Lemmon || Mount Lemmon Survey || — || align=right | 2.3 km || 
|-id=994 bgcolor=#E9E9E9
| 256994 ||  || — || March 13, 2008 || Catalina || CSS || — || align=right | 2.3 km || 
|-id=995 bgcolor=#fefefe
| 256995 ||  || — || March 1, 2008 || Kitt Peak || Spacewatch || — || align=right data-sort-value="0.97" | 970 m || 
|-id=996 bgcolor=#d6d6d6
| 256996 ||  || — || March 1, 2008 || Kitt Peak || Spacewatch || — || align=right | 3.5 km || 
|-id=997 bgcolor=#E9E9E9
| 256997 ||  || — || March 1, 2008 || Kitt Peak || Spacewatch || — || align=right | 1.8 km || 
|-id=998 bgcolor=#d6d6d6
| 256998 ||  || — || March 4, 2008 || Kitt Peak || Spacewatch || — || align=right | 4.0 km || 
|-id=999 bgcolor=#E9E9E9
| 256999 ||  || — || March 7, 2008 || Catalina || CSS || — || align=right | 2.7 km || 
|-id=000 bgcolor=#E9E9E9
| 257000 ||  || — || March 9, 2008 || Kitt Peak || Spacewatch || HEN || align=right | 1.2 km || 
|}

References

External links 
 Discovery Circumstances: Numbered Minor Planets (255001)–(260000) (IAU Minor Planet Center)

0256